= Index of ancient Greece-related articles =

This page lists topics related to ancient Greece.

== 0–9 ==
- 226 BC Rhodes earthquake
- 426 BC Malian Gulf tsunami
- 464 BC Sparta earthquake

== A ==
- Aba
- Abae
- Abaris the Hyperborean
- Abas
- Abas (son of Lynceus)
- Abderus
- Ablerus (mythology)
- Abolla
- Abron (ancient Greece)
- Absyrtus
- Acacallis
- Acacus
- Academic skepticism
- Academus
- Acamantis
- Acamas
- Acamas (son of Antenor)
- Acamas (son of Theseus)
- Acantha
- Acanthis
- Acanthus
- Acanthus of Sparta
- Acarnan (son of Alcmaeon)
- Acarnania
- Acarnanian League
- Acaste (Oceanid)
- Acastus
- Acatalepsy
- Aceso
- Acestor
- Achaea (ancient region)
- Achaea (Roman province)
- Achaea Phthiotis
- Achaean Leaders
- Achaean League
- Achaeans (Homer)
- Achaeans (tribe)
- Achaemenid destruction of Athens
- Achaeus (general)
- Achaeus
- Achaeus of Eretria
- Achaeus of Syracuse
- Achelois
- Acheloos Painter
- Achelous
- Acherdus
- Acheron
- Acherusia
- Achilleion (Thessaly)
- Achilleis (trilogy)
- Achilles
- Achilles and Patroclus
- Achilles' heel
- Achilles on Skyros
- Achilles Painter
- Achillicus
- Achiroe
- Achlys
- Acis and Galatea
- Acmon
- Acmon of Phrygia
- Acontius
- Acraea
- Acratopotes
- Acrion
- Acrisius
- Acrocorinth
- Acropolis
- Acropolis of Athens
- Acrotatus (father of Areus I)
- Acrotatus (king of Sparta)
- Acroterion
- Actaeon
- Actaeus
- Actor (mythology)
- Acumenus
- Acusilaus
- Adamas (mythology)
- Adeimantus of Collytus
- Adeimantus of Corinth
- Adephagia
- Adiaphora
- Adikia
- Admete (Oceanid)
- Admetus
- Admetus (mythology)
- Adonia
- Adonis
- Adrasteia
- Adrasteia (mythology)
- Adrastus
- Adrastus (mythology)
- Adrastus of Aphrodisias
- Adrastus (son of Gordias)
- Adrestia
- Adultery in Classical Athens
- Adymus of Beroea
- Adyton
- Aeaces (father of Polycrates)
- Aeacus
- Aeëtes
- Aegaeon
- Aegean civilization
- Aegeoneus
- Aegeus
- Aegeus (hero)
- Aegialeus (King of Argos)
- Aegialeus (King of Sicyon)
- Aegialeus (mythology)
- Aegialeus (strategos)
- Aegilia (Attica)
- Aegimius
- Aegipan
- Aegis
- Aegisthus
- Aegitium
- Aegium
- Aegius
- Aegle
- Aegolius
- Aegospotami
- Aegys
- Aeimnestus
- Aeinautae
- Aelius Nicon
- Aeneas
- Aenesidemus
- Aeolians
- Aeolic Greek
- Aeolic order
- Aeolus
- Aeolus (Odyssey)
- Aeolus (son of Hellen)
- Aeolus (son of Poseidon)
- Aepytus
- Aerope
- Aesacus
- Aesara
- Aeschines
- Aeschines (physician)
- Aeschines of Sphettus
- Aeschylus
- Aeschylus of Rhodes
- Aeson
- Aesop
- Aesop's Fables
- Aesymnetes
- Aethalidae
- Aethalides
- Aether (classical element)
- Aether (mythology)
- Aethlius
- Aethon
- Aethra
- Aethra (mother of Theseus)
- Aetion
- Aetius (philosopher)
- Aetna
- Aetnaeus
- Aetolia
- Aetolian campaign
- Aetolian League
- Aetolian War
- Aetolus
- Aetolus of Aetolia
- Aëtos
- Aexone
- Against Androtion
- Against Aristogeiton
- Against Eratosthenes
- Against Leptines
- Against Meidias
- Against Neaera
- Against Simon
- Against Spudias
- Against Stephanos
- Against the Sophists
- Against the Stepmother for Poisoning
- Against Timarchus
- Against Timocrates
- Agamede
- Agamedes
- Agamemnon
- Agamemnon (Zeus)
- Aganippe
- Aganippe (naiad)
- Agape
- Agapenor
- Agaptolemus
- Agasias, son of Menophilus
- Agasias of Arcadia
- Agasicles
- Agasthenes
- Agatharchides
- Agatharchus
- Agathodaemon
- Agathon
- Agathos kai sophos
- Agave
- Agdistis
- Agela
- Ageladas
- Agelaus
- Agenor
- Agenor (mythology)
- Agenor of Argos
- Agenor of Aetolia
- Agenor of Psophis
- Agenor of Troy
- Agenorides
- Agerochus
- Ages of Man
- Agesander of Rhodes
- Agesarchus of Tritaea
- Agesilaus I
- Agesilaus II
- Agesilaus (statesman)
- Agesilaus (Xenophon)
- Agesipolis I
- Agesipolis II
- Agesipolis III
- Agetor
- Agias of Sparta
- Agis I
- Agis II
- Agis III
- Agis IV
- Aglaea
- Aglaureion
- Aglaurus
- Aglaurus, daughter of Cecrops
- Agnaptus
- Agnodice
- Agoge
- Agon
- Agonius
- Agonothetes
- Agora
- Agora of the Competaliasts
- Agoracritus
- Agoraea
- Agoraios Kolonos
- Agoranomos
- Agoranomus
- Agreus and Nomios
- Agriculture in ancient Greece
- Agrionia
- Agrionius
- Agriopas
- Agrippa (astronomer)
- Agrius
- Agrius (son of Porthaon)
- Agrotera
- Agyieus
- Aiantis
- Aidoneus
- Aidos
- Ainis
- Aion
- Air (classical element)
- Aison (vase painter)
- Ajax (play)
- Ajax the Great
- Ajax the Lesser
- Akrotiri
- Akrotiri Boxer Fresco
- Alabandus
- Alabastron
- Alala
- Alalcomenae (Boeotia)
- Alalcomenes
- Alalcomenia
- Alastor
- Alazon
- Alcaeus
- Alcaeus and Philiscus
- Alcaeus of Mytilene
- Alcaic stanza
- Alcamenes
- Alcamenes, son of Sthenelaides
- Alcathous
- Alcathous of Elis
- Alces (mythology)
- Alcestis
- Alcibiades
- Alcidamas
- Alcidas
- Alcimachus of Apollonia
- Alcimedon
- Alcimus
- Alcinoe
- Alcinoë of Corinth
- Alcinous
- Alcmaeon (mythology)
- Alcmaeon in Corinth
- Alcmaeon of Croton
- Alcmaeonidae
- Alcman
- Alcmaeon
- Alcmaeon, son of Megacles
- Alcmaeon of Athens
- Alcmene
- Alcmenes
- Alcmenor
- Alcmeonis
- Alcon
- Alcyone
- Alcyone (daughter of Sciron)
- Alcyone (Pleiad)
- Alcyone and Ceyx
- Alcyoneus
- Alcyoneus (son of Diomos)
- Alea (Greek soldier)
- Alecto
- Alectryon
- Alepotrypa cave
- Aletes (Heraclid)
- Aletes of Mycenae
- Aletheia
- Aleuadae
- Aleuas
- Aleus
- Alexander (Aetolian general)
- Alexander (artists)
- Alexander of Pherae
- Alexander of Rhodes
- Alexander Sarcophagus
- Alexanor
- Alexiares and Anicetus
- Alexicacus
- Alexicles (general)
- Alexicrates
- Alexinus
- Alexippus
- Alexis (poet)
- Alexis (sculptor)
- Alexon
- Algos
- Alipherus
- Alkimachos of Pydna
- Allegory of the cave
- Almops
- Almus of Orchomenus
- Aloadae
- Alope
- Alope (spring)
- Alopece
- Alpha
- Alphesiboea of Psophis
- Alpheus (deity)
- Alpos
- Altamura Painter
- Altar of Athena Polias
- Altar of Hieron
- Altar of the Chians
- Altar of the Twelve Gods
- Altar of Zeus Agoraios
- Althaea
- Althaemenes
- Alypius of Alexandria
- Alypus
- Alytarches
- Alyzeus
- Amaleus
- Amalthea (mythology)
- Amantes (tribe)
- Amaracus
- Amarynceus
- Amasis Painter
- Amasis (potter)
- Amathusia
- Amazon statue types
- Amazonius
- Amazonomachy
- Amazons
- Ambracia
- Ambrax
- Ambrosia
- Ambryon
- Ambulia
- Amechania
- Ameinias of Athens
- Ameinocles
- Ameipsias
- Amentum
- Ammonius Saccas
- Amoebaean singing
- Amompharetus
- Ampersand Painter
- Amphiaraos Krater
- Amphiareion of Oropos
- Amphicleia
- Amphictyon
- Amphictyonic League
- Amphictyonis
- Amphidromia
- Amphillogiai
- Amphilochus I of Argos
- Amphilochus II of Argos
- Amphilochus (mythology)
- Amphimachus I of Elis
- Amphimachus II of Elis
- Amphimachus of Caria
- Amphimachus of Mycenae
- Amphimedon
- Amphinome
- Amphinomus
- Amphion
- Amphion and Zethus
- Amphipole
- Amphiprostyle
- Amphirho
- Amphis
- Amphisbaena
- Amphithea
- Amphithemis
- Amphitrite
- Amphitryon
- Amphora
- Amphora (unit)
- Amphora of Hermonax in Würzburg
- Amphoterus (son of Alcmaeon)
- Ampyx
- Amulet MS 5236
- Amyclae
- Amyclas
- Amyclas of Sparta
- Amycus (centaur)
- Amydon
- Amykos
- Amykos Painter
- Amynomachus
- Amyntor
- Amythaon
- Anabasis (Xenophon)
- Anacaea
- Anacharsis
- Anacleteria
- Anacreon
- Anactor
- Anagnorisis
- Anagyros (hero)
- Anagyrous
- Anagyrus Painter
- Anaideia
- Anakes
- Analatos Painter
- Analogy of the divided line
- Analogy of the Sun
- Anamnesis
- Ananke
- Anaphlystus
- Anapus
- Anathyrosis
- Anax
- Anax (mythology)
- Anaxagoras
- Anaxagoras (mythology)
- Anaxagoras of Aegina
- Anaxander
- Anaxandra
- Anaxandridas I
- Anaxandridas II
- Anaxandrides
- Anaxarchus
- Anaxibia
- Anaxibius
- Anaxidamus
- Anaxilas (comic poet)
- Anaximander
- Anaximenes of Miletus
- Anaxippus
- Anaxis
- Anaxo
- Anaxo (daughter of Alcaeus)
- Ancaeus (son of Poseidon)
- Anchiale
- Anchialus
- Anchises
- Ancient accounts of Homer
- Ancient Agora of Athens
- Ancient Corinth
- Ancient Elis
- Ancient Greece
- Ancient Greece–Ancient India relations
- Ancient Greece and wine
- Ancient Greek
- Ancient Greek accent
- Ancient Greek architecture
- Ancient Greek art
- Ancient Greek astronomy
- Ancient Greek boxing
- Ancient Greek calendars
- Ancient Greek clubs
- Ancient Greek coinage
- Ancient Greek comedy
- Ancient Greek conditional clauses
- Ancient Greek cuisine
- Ancient Greek dialects
- Ancient Greek flood myths
- Ancient Greek folklore
- Ancient Greek funeral and burial practices
- Ancient Greek funerary vases
- Ancient Greek grammar
- Ancient Greek law
- Ancient Greek literature
- Ancient Greek medicine
- Ancient Greek mercenaries
- Ancient Greek military personal equipment
- Ancient Greek Musical Notation
- Ancient Greek nouns
- Ancient Greek novel
- Ancient Greek Numbers (Unicode block)
- Ancient Greek Olympic festivals
- Ancient Greek personal names
- Ancient Greek philosophy
- Ancient Greek phonology
- Ancient Greek present progressive markers
- Ancient Greek religion
- Ancient Greek sculpture
- Ancient Greek technology
- Ancient Greek temple
- Ancient Greek units of measurement
- Ancient Greek verbs
- Ancient Greek warfare
- Ancient harbour of Samos
- Ancient history of Cyprus
- Ancient Macedonian army
- Ancient Macedonian language
- Ancient Magnesia
- Ancient Olympic Games
- Ancient Olympic pentathlon
- Ancient Theatre of Epidaurus
- Ancient theatre of Taormina
- Ancient Thera
- Ancient Thessaly
- Ancyle
- Andokides (potter)
- Andokides (vase painter)
- Andraemon
- Andragathus
- Androcleia and Alcis
- Androcleides
- Androcydes (painter)
- Androdamas
- Androetas
- Androgeos
- Androgeus (Aeneid)
- Androgeus (son of Minos)
- Androlepsy
- Andromache
- Andromache (play)
- Andromachus
- Andromeda
- Andron
- Andron (physician)
- Andronicus of Rhodes
- Andropompus
- Androtion
- Androtion (historian)
- Anemoi
- Aneristus
- Anethus
- Angele (deme)
- Angelitos Athena
- Angelos
- Anius
- Anniceris
- Anonymus Londinensis
- Anta
- Anta capital
- Antae temple
- Antaea
- Antaeus
- Antaeus (physician)
- Antalcidas
- Antefix
- Anteias
- Antenor
- Antenor (mythology)
- Antenor of Troy
- Antenor (writer)
- Antenor Kore
- Antenorides
- Antepredicament
- Anteros
- Anthas
- Anthedon (Boeotia)
- Antheia
- Anthesphoria
- Anthesteria
- Antheus
- Anthippe
- Anthippe and Cichyrus
- Anthippus
- Anticlea
- Anticlus
- Anticrates
- Antigenes
- Antigenes (historian)
- Antigone
- Antigone (mythology)
- Antigone (Euripides play)
- Antigone (Sophocles play)
- Antigonia
- Antigonid dynasty
- Antigonid Macedonian army
- Antigonid–Nabataean confrontations
- Antigonus (historian)
- Antigonus (mythology)
- Antigonus (physician)
- Antigonus (sculptor)
- Antigonus of Carystus
- Antikyra
- Antikythera
- Antikythera Ephebe
- Antikythera mechanism
- Antikythera wreck
- Antilochus
- Antilochus (historian)
- Antimachia
- Antimachus
- Antimachus (sculptor)
- Antimenes Painter
- Antimoerus
- Antinoeis
- Antinous of Ithaca
- Antiochis (tribe)
- Antiochus (admiral)
- Antiochus (mythology)
- Antiochus (physician)
- Antiochus (sculptor)
- Antiochus of Arcadia
- Antiochus of Ascalon
- Antiope
- Antiope (Amazon)
- Antipater
- Antipater (astrologer)
- Antipater of Acanthus
- Antipater of Cyrene
- Antipater of Sidon
- Antipater of Tarsus
- Antipater of Tyre
- Antipatitis
- Antipatrid dynasty
- Antiperistasis
- Antiphanes (comic poet)
- Antiphanes of Argos
- Antiphates
- Antiphemus
- Antiphera
- Antiphilus
- Antiphon (brother of Plato)
- Antiphon (orator)
- Antiphon (tragic poet)
- Antiphon (writer)
- Antiphon Painter
- Antiphonus
- Antiphus
- Antisthenes
- Antisthenes (Heraclitean)
- Antisthenes of Rhodes
- Antisthenes of Sparta
- Antistrophe
- Antonius
- Antonius of Argos
- Antorides
- Anyte of Tegea
- Anytos
- Anytus
- Aoede
- Aoidos
- Aon
- Aorist
- Aorist (Ancient Greek)
- Aornum
- Apanchomene
- Apate
- Apatheia
- Apaturia
- Apaturia (Greek mythology)
- Apaturius
- Apega of Nabis
- Apeiron
- Apella
- Apellai
- Apellaia
- Apellas
- Apelles
- Apemius
- Apesantius
- Aphareus
- Aphareus (writer)
- Aphareus of Messenia
- Apheidas
- Aphidna
- Aphneius
- Aphrodisia
- Aphrodite
- Aphrodite Hypolympidia
- Aphrodite of Knidos
- Aphrodite of the Gardens
- Aphrodite of Rhodes
- Aphrodite of Syracuse
- Aphrodite Pandemos
- Aphrodite Rhithymnia
- Aphrodite Urania
- Aphroditus
- Apis (Greek mythology)
- Apis of Argos
- Apis of Sicyon
- Apobates Base
- Apocatastasis
- Apodektai
- Apodicticity
- Apollo
- Apollo and Daphne
- Apollo Citharoedus
- Apollo of Mantua
- Apollo of Piombino
- Apollo Omphalos
- Apollodoros (vase painter)
- Apollodorus (general)
- Apollodorus (painter)
- Apollodorus (sculptor)
- Apollodorus Logisticus
- Apollodorus of Acharnae
- Apollodorus of Athens
- Apollodorus of Boeotia
- Apollodorus of Carystus
- Apollodorus of Cyrene
- Apollodorus of Erythrae
- Apollodorus of Phaleron
- Apollodorus of Seleucia
- Apollodorus of Tarsus
- Apollonian and Dionysian
- Apollonides (governor of Argos)
- Apollonides (philosopher)
- Apollonides of Boeotia
- Apollonides of Cardia
- Apollonides of Cos
- Apollonides of Smyrna
- Apollonides of Sparta
- Apollonieis
- Apollonis
- Apollonius
- Apollonius Cronus
- Apollonius Molon
- Apollonius of Acharnae
- Apollonius of Aphrodisias
- Apollonius of Chalcedon
- Apollonius of Clazomenae
- Apollonius of Laodicea
- Apollonius of Perga
- Apollonius of Tyana
- Apollonius (son of Archias)
- Apollonius (son of Chaeris)
- Apollothemis
- Apology (Xenophon)
- Apomyius
- Aponia
- Apophantic
- Aporia
- Apotropaei
- Apotrophia
- Apoxyomenos
- Apple of Discord
- Apsines
- Apulian vase painting
- Arabius (mythology)
- Aracus (admiral)
- Arae
- Araphen
- Araros
- Aratus of Sicyon
- Arbius
- Arcadia
- Arcadian League
- Arcadocypriot Greek
- Arcas
- Arcesilaus
- Arcesilaus (mythology)
- Arcesius
- Archaeological Park of Dion
- Archaeological site of Terpsithea Square
- Archaic Greece
- Archaic Greek alphabets
- Archaic smile
- Arche
- Arche (mythology)
- Archedicus
- Archegetes
- Archelaus (geographer)
- Archelaus (Heraclid)
- Archelaus (philosopher)
- Archelaus (play)
- Archelaus Chersonesita
- Archelaus of Sparta
- Archelochus
- Archemachus
- Archemachus of Euboea
- Archermus
- Archestratus
- Archestratus (general)
- Archestratus (music theorist)
- Archias of Corinth
- Archidamus (physician)
- Archidamus I
- Archidamus II
- Archidamus III
- Archidamus IV
- Archidamus V
- Archilochus
- Archimedes
- Archimedes Palimpsest
- Archimelus
- Archinus
- Archinus (historian)
- Archon
- Archon basileus
- Archytas
- Archytas of Mytilene
- Ardalus
- Ardeas
- Aregon
- Areopagite constitution
- Areopagus
- Ares
- Ares Borghese
- Aresas
- Arestor
- Arete
- Arete (mythology)
- Aretes of Dyrrachium
- Arethusa (Boeotia)
- Arethusa (Ithaca)
- Arethusa (nymph)
- Aretology
- Areus I
- Areus II
- Arezzo 1465 vase
- Argalus
- Arge
- Arges (Cyclops)
- Argeus of Argos
- Argia
- Argileonis
- Argiope
- Argius
- Argive vase painting
- Argo
- Argonautica
- Argonauts
- Argos
- Argos (dog)
- Argos panoply
- Argos Theater
- Argus (Argonaut)
- Argus (king of Argos)
- Argus (mythology)
- Argus Panoptes
- Agryle
- Argyramoiboi
- Argyraspides
- Argyrocopeum
- Arignote
- Arimaspi
- Arimneste
- Arimnestos
- Arimoi
- Arion
- Arion (mythology)
- Ariphron
- Arisbas
- Arisbe
- Aristaeus
- Aristaeus (giant)
- Aristaeus the Elder
- Aristagoras
- Aristander of Paros
- Aristarchus of Athens
- Aristarchus of Colchis
- Aristarchus of Samos
- Aristarchus of Samothrace
- Aristarchus of Sparta
- Aristarchus of Tegea
- Aristeas (sculptor)
- Aristeia
- Aristeides
- Aristeus
- Aristias
- Aristides
- Aristides of Thebes
- Aristion
- Aristion (physician)
- Aristippus
- Aristippus of Larissa
- Aristippus the Younger
- Aristo of Ceos
- Aristocleidas
- Aristocleides
- Aristocles (sculptors)
- Aristocles of Messene
- Aristocracy
- Aristodemus
- Aristodemus of Cydathenaeum
- Aristodemus of Miletus
- Aristodemus of Sparta
- Aristogeiton (orator)
- Aristoi
- Aristolaos
- Aristomachos of Argos
- Aristomachus
- Aristomenes
- Ariston (painter)
- Ariston of Athens
- Ariston of Sparta
- Aristonymus
- Aristophanes
- Aristophanes (vase painter)
- Aristophanes of Byzantium
- Aristophon (comic poet)
- Aristotelian ethics
- Aristotelianism
- Aristotle
- Aristotle's biology
- Aristotle's theory of universals
- Aristotle's views on women
- Aristotle's wheel paradox
- Aristotle of Cyrene
- Aristoxenus
- Aristoxenus (physician)
- Arithmetica
- Arius Didymus
- Arkalochori Axe
- Arkesilas Cup
- Arkesilas Painter
- Armed Aphrodite
- Arnaeus
- Arrephorion
- Arrephoros
- Arrhephoria
- Arrhichion
- Arrian
- Arsinoe (daughter of Nicocreon)
- Arsinoe (mythology)
- Arsis and thesis
- Artas of Messapia
- Artemiche
- Artemidorus
- Artemis
- Artemision Bronze
- Arundel marbles
- Arura
- Aryballos
- Asbolus
- Ascalaphus
- Ascalaphus (son of Acheron)
- Ascalaphus of Orchomenus
- Ascanius
- Asclepiad (title)
- Asclepiades of Phlius
- Asclepiades the Cynic
- Asclepiodorus (painter)
- Asclepiodotus (philosopher)
- Asclepeion
- Asclepius
- Ascolia
- Asebeia
- Asia (mythology)
- Asia (Oceanid)
- Asine (Messenia)
- Asius
- Asius of Samos
- Asklepieion of Athens
- Askos
- Asopis
- Asphodel Meadows
- Aspis
- Assaon
- Astacus (mythology)
- Asteas
- Asteria
- Asterion (god)
- Asterion (king of Crete)
- Asterius (giant)
- Asterius (mythology)
- Asterodia
- Asteropaios
- Asterope (Hesperid)
- Asterope (mythology)
- Astomi
- Astraea
- Astraeus
- Astraeus (mythology)
- Astris
- Astronomical rings
- Asty
- Astyanax
- Astydameia
- Astydamia (wife of Acastus)
- Astylochus
- Astymedusa
- Astynomus
- Astynous
- Atalanta
- Atalante Hermes
- Atas
- Ateleia
- Atene (deme)
- Athamanians
- Athena
- Athena Alea
- Athena Alkidemos
- Athena Areia
- Athena Demegorusa
- Athena Painter
- Athena Parthenos
- Athena Promachos
- Athenaeus
- Athenaeus (musician)
- Athenaeus Mechanicus
- Athenian Band Cup by the Oakeshott Painter (MET 17.230.5)
- Athenian coinage decree
- Athenian coup of 411 BC
- Athenian democracy
- Athenian festivals
- Athenian Grain-Tax Law of 374/3 B.C.
- Athenian military
- Athenian Revolution
- Athenian sacred ships
- Athenian Treasury
- Athenians Project
- Athenion of Maroneia
- Athenodorus Cananites
- Athenodorus of Soli
- Athens
- Atheradas of Laconia
- Athmonum
- Athos
- Atimia
- Atintanians
- Atlantis
- Atlas (architecture)
- Atlas (mythology)
- Atomism
- Atrax (mythology)
- Atrax (Thessaly)
- Atreus
- Atropos
- Attaginus
- Attalid dynasty
- Attalus (general)
- Attalus of Rhodes
- Atthidographer
- Attic calendar
- Attic declension
- Attic Greek
- Attic helmet
- Attic numerals
- Attic orators
- Attic talent
- Attic War
- Attic weight
- Attica
- Atticism
- Atticus (philosopher)
- Attis
- Atymnius
- Atys (son of Croesus)
- Atys of Lydia
- Augeas
- Aulis
- Aulos
- Aura (mythology)
- Auridae
- Autariatae
- Autesion
- Autochthe
- Autochthon
- Autokrator
- Autolycus
- Autolycus of Pitane
- Automedon
- Autonoe (mythology)
- Autonoë (daughter of Cadmus)
- Autonous
- Axiochus (Alcmaeonid)
- Axiochus (dialogue)
- Axion
- Axiotta
- Axylus
- Azan (mythology)
- Azania
- Azenia (Attica)
- Azone

== B ==
- Babys
- Bacchiadae
- Bacchius of Tanagra
- Bacchoi
- Bacchylides
- Baiake
- Bakis
- Balius and Xanthus
- Ballista
- Baltimore Painter
- Banausos
- Band cup
- Band skyphos
- Baptes
- Barbiton
- Barytone
- Basileus
- Basilides (Stoic)
- Basilides of Tyre
- Basilides the Epicurean
- Basilinna
- Bassaris
- Bate (Attica)
- Batea
- Bathonea
- Bathycles
- Bathycles of Magnesia
- Batiae
- Batis of Lampsacus
- Batrachomyomachia
- Battiadae
- Battle of Abydos
- Battle of Aegina
- Battle of Aegospotami
- Battle of Alalia
- Battle of Amorgos
- Battle of Amphipolis
- Battle of Arginusae
- Battle of Artemisium
- Battle of Asculum
- Battle of Beneventum (275 BC)
- Battle of Byzantium
- Battle of Catana (397 BC)
- Battle of Chaeronea (338 BC)
- Battle of Chios (201 BC)
- Battle of Cnidus
- Battle of Corinth (146 BC)
- Battle of Coronea (394 BC)
- Battle of Coronea (447 BC)
- Battle of Corupedium
- Battle of Crannon
- Battle of Cretopolis
- Battle of Crocus Field
- Battle of Cumae
- Battle of Cunaxa
- Battle of Cynoscephalae (364 BC)
- Battle of Cynoscephalae
- Battle of Cynossema
- Battle of Cyzicus
- Battle of Delium
- Battle of Deres
- Battle of Dyme
- Battle of Embata
- Battle of Ephesus (ca. 258 BC)
- Battle of Eretria
- Battle of Gabiene
- Battle of Gaugamela
- Battle of Gaza (312 BC)
- Battle of Haliartus
- Battle of Heraclea
- Battle of Himera (409 BC)
- Battle of Himera (480 BC)
- Battle of Hysiae (417 BC)
- Battle of Hysiae (c. 669 BC)
- Battle of Idomene
- Battle of Ipsus
- Battle of Issus
- Battle of Lade
- Battle of Lade (201 BC)
- Battle of Lechaeum
- Battle of Leontion
- Battle of Leuctra
- Battle of Lyncestis
- Battle of Lysimachia
- Battle of Mantinea (207 BC)
- Battle of Mantinea (362 BC)
- Battle of Mantinea (418 BC)
- Battle of Marathon
- Battle of Megalopolis
- Battle of Megara
- Battle of Mount Lycaeum
- Battle of Munychia
- Battle of Mycale
- Battle of Myonessus
- Battle of Mytilene (406 BC)
- Battle of Naupactus
- Battle of Naxos
- Battle of Nemea
- Battle of Notium
- Battle of Oenophyta
- Battle of Olpae
- Battle of Orkynia
- Battle of Orneae
- Battle of Pandosia
- Battle of Paraitakene
- Battle of Paxos
- Battle of Pharos
- Battle of Phoenice
- Battle of Phyle
- Battle of Piraeus
- Battle of Plataea
- Battle of Plataea (323 BC)
- Battle of Potidaea
- Battle of Pydna
- Battle of Pylos
- Battle of Raphia
- Battle of Rhium
- Battle of Salamis
- Battle of Salamis (306 BC)
- Battle of Scarpheia
- Battle of Sellasia
- Battle of Sepeia
- Battle of Spartolos
- Battle of Sphacteria
- Battle of Sybota
- Battle of Syme
- Battle of Tanagra (426 BC)
- Battle of Tanagra (457 BC)
- Battle of Tegyra
- Battle of Thebes
- Battle of Thermopylae
- Battle of Thermopylae (279 BC)
- Battle of Thermopylae (323 BC)
- Battle of the Echinades (322 BC)
- Battle of the Eurymedon
- Battle of the Eurymedon (190 BC)
- Battle of the Granicus
- Battle of the Hellespont (321 BC)
- Battle of the Hydaspes
- Battle of the 300 Champions
- Battle of the Fetters
- Battle of the Great Foss
- Battle of the Strait of Messina
- Battle of the Tigris
- Battus
- Baubo
- Baucis and Philemon
- Belbina (Argolis)
- Beldam Painter
- Belemina
- Bellerophon
- Bellerophon Painter
- Bellerophon (play)
- Belly Amphora by the Andokides Painter (Munich 2301)
- Bema
- Bema of Phaidros
- Bematist
- Bembina (Argolis)
- Bendidia
- Bene (Crete)
- Boeotian muses
- Berenice (Epirus)
- Berenicidae
- Berlin Foundry Cup
- Berlin Painter
- Beroe
- Besa (Attica)
- Bessa (Locris)
- Beta
- Between Scylla and Charybdis
- Bia
- Biannus
- Bias
- Bias (son of Amythaon)
- Bias of Priene
- Bibliotheca (Pseudo-Apollodorus)
- Bident
- Bienor
- Bilingual kylix by the Andokides painter
- Bilingual vase painting
- Bion of Abdera
- Bion of Borysthenes
- Bionnus
- Bireme
- Bisaltae
- Bisaltes
- Biston
- Bistonis
- Biton of Pergamon
- Black-figure pottery
- Black-glazed Ware
- Black soup
- Blond Kouros's Head of the Acropolis
- BMN Painter
- Boar's tusk helmet
- Boebe (Thessaly)
- Boedromia
- Boeotarch
- Boeotia
- Boeotian Dancer's Group Kothon, Black Figure Tripod, 6th Century B.C.
- Boeotian helmet
- Boeotian shield
- Boeotian Treasury
- Boeotian vase painting
- Boeotian War
- Boeotus
- Boeotus (son of Poseidon)
- Boeotus of Sicyon
- Boethus of Chalcedon
- Boethus of Sidon (Peripatetic)
- Boethus of Sidon (Stoic)
- Boios
- Boium
- Bolbe
- Bolina
- Bolina (Achaea)
- Bomolochus
- Book of Lemmas
- Boreads
- Boreas
- Borghese Gladiator
- Borghese Vase
- Bormus
- Borus
- Borysthenes
- Borysthenis
- Bosporan Kingdom
- Botres
- Bottiaea
- Boudeion
- Boukris
- Boule
- Bouleuterion
- Bouleutic oath
- Bounos
- Boustrophedon
- Bouzyges
- Bowl of Hygieia
- Boxer Stele Fragment from Kerameikos
- Boxing Siana Cup
- Brachyllas
- Branchus (lover of Apollo)
- Brangas
- Brasidas
- Brauroneion
- Brea (Thrace)
- Bremon
- Bremusa
- Brimo
- Briseis
- Briseus
- Britomartis
- Brizo
- Bromius
- Brontinus
- Bronze Diskos Thrower Statue
- Bronze Statuette of Athletic Spartan Girl
- Broteas
- Brothers Poem
- Bryaxis
- Brycus
- Brygos
- Brygos cup of Würzburg
- Brygos Painter
- Bryn Mawr Painter
- Bryseae
- Bryson of Achaea
- Bryson of Heraclea
- Buchetium
- Bucolion
- Bucolus
- Budeia
- Bularchus
- Bulis
- Bull-Leaping Fresco
- Bull of the Corcyreans
- Bupalus and Athenis
- Buphagus
- Buphonia
- Buprasium
- Bura
- Burgon Group
- Burgon vase
- Buskin
- Bust of Antinous (NAMA)
- Bust of Hadrian (Piraeus)
- Butadae
- Butades
- Butes
- Bybon
- Byssa
- Byzantium
- Byzas

== C ==
- C Painter
- Caanthus
- Cabeiri
- Cabeiro
- Cadmea
- Cadmean victory
- Cadmus
- Cadmus of Miletus
- Caduceus
- Caduceus as a symbol of medicine
- Caeneus
- Caeretan hydria
- Caerus
- Calamis (4th century BC)
- Calamis (5th century BC)
- Calathus (basket)
- Calchas
- Calchus
- Calesius
- Caletor
- Caliadne
- Callias III
- Callichore
- Callicles
- Callicrates
- Callicrates of Sparta
- Callicratidas
- Callidice
- Callidice of Thesprotia
- Callimachus (polemarch)
- Callimedon
- Callinus
- Calliope
- Calliphon
- Calliphon of Croton
- Callippides
- Callippus
- Callippus of Syracuse
- Callirhoë (Calydonian woman)
- Callirhoe (daughter of Achelous)
- Callirhoe (mythology)
- Callirhoe (Oceanid)
- Callisthenes
- Calliste
- Callisto
- Callistratus (grammarian)
- Callithyia
- Callixenus
- Calyce
- Calydnus
- Calydon
- Calydon of Aetolia
- Calydon (son of Ares)
- Calydoneus
- Calydonian boar hunt
- Calypso (mythology)
- Calyx-Krater by the artist called the Painter of the Berlin Hydria depicting an Amazonomachy
- Cameirus (mythology)
- Campanian vase painting
- Campe
- Canace
- Canachus
- Candalus
- Candaon
- Candaules
- Canephoria
- Canethus
- Canopus
- Canosa vases
- Canthus
- Cap of invisibility
- Capaneus
- Cape Matapan
- Capture of Oechalia
- Capys of Dardania
- Car (mythology)
- Car of Caria
- Carcinus (writer)
- Cardamyle
- Cardia
- Carius
- Carmanor (of Crete)
- Carmanor (son of Dionysus)
- Carme (mythology)
- Carneades
- Carneia
- Carneiscus
- Carnus
- Carpaea
- Carpus of Antioch
- Caryae
- Caryatid
- Caryatids of Eleusis
- Caryatis
- Carystius
- Carystus
- Cassandra
- Cassandra (metaphor)
- Cassandreia
- Cassiopeia (mother of Andromeda)
- Cassiphone
- Cassopaei
- Cassope
- Cassotis
- Castalia
- Castellani Painter
- Castor of Rhodes
- Catalogue of Ships
- Catalogue of Women
- Catamite
- Catastasis
- Categories (Aristotle)
- Catharsis
- Catoptrics
- Catreus
- Cattle of Helios
- Caucon
- Caucones
- Caunos (mythology)
- Cavalcade Painter
- Cave of Euripides
- Cave Sanctuaries of the Akropolis
- Cebes
- Cebren
- Cebriones
- Cecrops
- Cecrops I
- Cecrops II
- Cedalion
- Cedi (Attica)
- Celaeneus
- Celaeno
- Celaeno (Pleiad)
- Celaenus (mythology)
- Celestial spheres
- Celeus
- Celeus (Crete)
- Cella
- Celtine
- Celtus
- Cenchreis
- Centaur
- Centaurides
- Central Greece
- Centuripe ware
- Cephale
- Cephalion
- Cephalus
- Cephalus of Athens
- Cephalus (son of Deion)
- Cepheus (father of Andromeda)
- Cepheus (king of Tegea)
- Cephisia
- Cephisodorus
- Cephisodotus (general)
- Cephisodotus the Elder
- Cephisodotus the Younger
- Cephisso
- Cephissus
- Cerambus
- Cerameicus Painter
- Cerameis
- Ceraon
- Cerastes
- Cerberus
- Cercaphus
- Cercaphus (Heliadae)
- Cercetes
- Cercidas
- Cercopes
- Cercopes (epic poem)
- Cercops
- Cercyon
- Cercyon of Eleusis
- Cerdo (mythology)
- Ceremonies of ancient Greece
- Ceriadae
- Cerinthus (Euboea)
- Ceroessa
- Ceryneian Hind
- Ceryx
- Cestria (Epirus)
- Cestrinus
- Ceto
- Ceto (mythology)
- Cettus
- Cetus
- Ceuthonymus
- Ceyx of Trachis
- Chabrias
- Chaeremon
- Chaeremon of Alexandria
- Chaerephon
- Chaeresilaus
- Chaeron of Pellene
- Chaeronea
- Chaetus
- Chalandriani
- Chalceia
- Chalcidian helmet
- Chalcidianising cup
- Chalciope
- Chalcis
- Chalcis (Aetolia)
- Chalcis (Epirus)
- Chalcis Decree
- Chalcodon
- Chalcon
- Chaldean Oracles
- Chalkaspides
- Chalkidian pottery
- Chalkidiki
- Chalkotheke
- Chamaeleon (philosopher)
- Chaon
- Chaonia
- Chaonians
- Chaos
- Charadra (Epirus)
- Charadra (Messenia)
- Charadra (Phocis)
- Chares of Athens
- Chares of Lindos
- Charicles
- Chariclo
- Charidemus
- Charilaus
- Chariot Allegory
- Charioteer of Delphi
- Charis (mythology)
- Charisticary
- Charites
- Charitimides
- Charition mime
- Chariton
- Charixene
- Charmadas
- Charmides
- Charmides (dialogue)
- Charmus
- Charnabon
- Charon
- Charon's obol
- Charondas
- Charops
- Charybdis
- Chastieis
- Chatsworth Head
- Cheirisophus (general)
- Chelidon (mythology)
- Chelidon (sister of Aëdon)
- Chelys
- Cheramyes
- Chersias
- Chersiphron
- Chi (letter)
- Chian wine
- Chigi vase
- Children of Heracles
- Chiliarch
- Chilon of Patras
- Chilon of Sparta
- Chion of Heraclea
- Chione
- Chione (daughter of Arcturus)
- Chione (daughter of Boreas)
- Chione (daughter of Callirrhoe)
- Chione (daughter of Daedalion)
- Chionides
- Chionis of Sparta
- Chios
- Chios (Caria)
- Chirimachus
- Chiron
- Chiton
- Chiusi Painter
- Chlamys
- Chloris
- Chloris (nymph)
- Chloris of Thebes
- Choerilus (playwright)
- Choerilus of Samos
- Cholargos (deme)
- Cholleidae
- Choragic Monument of Nikias
- Choragic Monument of Thrasyllos
- Choral poetry
- Choreia
- Chorizontes
- Chorus of the elderly in classical Greek drama
- Chremonidean War
- Chrestomathy
- Chromia
- Chromis
- Chromius
- Chronology of ancient Greek mathematicians
- Chronos
- Chrysanthis
- Chrysaor
- Chryse (Lesbos)
- Chryse (mythology)
- Chryse (ancient Greek placename)
- Chryseis
- Chryseis (mythology)
- Chryselephantine sculpture
- Chryselephantine statues at Delphi
- Chryses (mythology)
- Chryses of Troy
- Chrysippe
- Chrysippus
- Chrysippus (mythology)
- Chrysippus of Cnidos
- Chrysippus of Elis
- Chrysis Painter
- Chrysogonus of Athens
- Chrysondyon
- Chrysothemis
- Chrysothemis (daughter of Agamemnon)
- Chrysus
- Chthonia
- Chthonic
- Chthonius
- Cicynna
- Cilix
- Cilla
- Cilla (city)
- Cimon
- Cimon Coalemos
- Cimon of Cleonae
- Cinaethon of Sparta
- Cineas
- Cineas (Athenian)
- Cinyras
- Cipollino marble
- Circe
- Cisseus
- Cistophorus
- Cisus
- Cissus (mythology)
- Cithara
- Citharode
- City walls of Athens
- Class of Cabinet des Médailles 218
- Classical Greece
- Classical mythology
- Classical order
- Classical sculpture
- Claw of Archimedes
- Cleander of Gela
- Cleander of Sparta
- Cleandridas
- Cleanthes
- Cleanthes (artist)
- Clearchus of Rhegium
- Clearchus of Soli
- Clearchus of Sparta
- Cleidemus
- Cleinias
- Cleinias of Tarentum
- Cleisthenes
- Cleisthenes (son of Sibyrtius)
- Cleitagora
- Cleite
- Cleitus the Black
- Cleitus the White
- Cleoboea
- Cleobule
- Cleobulina
- Cleobulus
- Cleocharia
- Cleodaeus
- Cleodora (nymph)
- Cleodorus
- Cleolaus
- Cleolla
- Cleomachus
- Cleombrotus I
- Cleombrotus II
- Cleombrotus (regent)
- Cleombrotus of Ambracia
- Cleomedes
- Cleomenean War
- Cleomenes I
- Cleomenes II
- Cleomenes III
- Cleomenes (seer)
- Cleomenes the Cynic
- Cleon
- Cleon (mythology)
- Cleon (sculptor)
- Cleonaeus
- Cleondas of Thebes
- Cleonides
- Cleonymus of Athens
- Cleonymus of Sparta
- Cleopatra
- Cleopatra (Danaid)
- Cleopatra (daughter of Idas)
- Cleopatra (mythology)
- Cleophon (poet)
- Cleophon (politician)
- Cleostratus
- Cleostratus (mythology)
- Cleothera
- Cleruchy
- Climacteric year
- Clinomachus
- Clio
- Clio (mythology)
- Clipeus
- Clitomachus (philosopher)
- Clitophon (Athenian)
- Clitophon (dialogue)
- Clitorians
- Clonia (nymph)
- Clonius
- Clothing in ancient Greece
- Clotho
- Clymene (mother of Phaethon)
- Clymene
- Clymene (wife of Iapetus)
- Clymenus
- Clytemnestra
- Clytie
- Clytie (Oceanid)
- Clytius
- Clytus
- Cnemus
- Cnidian Treasury
- Coa vestis
- Coan wine
- Coastal Lamptrai
- Cocalus
- Cocytus
- Codrus
- Codrus Painter
- Coele
- Coeranus
- Coeratadas
- Coes of Mytilene
- Coinage of Side
- Coinage of the Social War (91–88 BC)
- Colaeus
- Collytus
- Colonae (Leontis)
- Colonides
- Colonus (Attica)
- Colophon
- Colossus of Rhodes
- Colossus of the Naxians
- Colotes
- Columbus Painter
- Comaetho
- Comaetho of Cilicia
- Comaetho (priestess)
- Comast Group
- Combe
- Comedy and tragedy masks
- Cometas
- Cometes
- Common Peace
- Companion cavalry
- Comus
- Concentric spheres
- Congress at the Isthmus of Corinth
- Congress of Gela
- Conisterium
- Conon
- Conon (mythographer)
- Conon of Samos
- Conservation and restoration of ancient Greek pottery
- Conspiracy of Cinadon
- Constitution of the Athenians (Pseudo-Xenophon)
- Constitution of the Lacedaemonians
- Constitution of the Athenians (Aristotle)
- Contest of Cithaeron and Helicon
- Contest of Homer and Hesiod
- Conthyle
- Contrapposto
- Controversia
- Coön
- Copae
- Copreus (mythology)
- Copreus of Elis
- Coprus
- Corax of Syracuse
- Corax (mythology)
- Cordax
- Coresus
- Corinthian bronze
- Corinthian helmet
- Corinthian order
- Corinthian War
- Corinthus
- Coriscus of Scepsis
- Corium (Crete)
- Coroebus
- Coroebus of Elis
- Coronaeus
- Corone (crow)
- Corone (Messenia)
- Coroneia (Boeotia)
- Coronis
- Coronis (lover of Apollo)
- Coronis (textual symbol)
- Coronus
- Coroplast (artisan)
- Corpus Aristotelicum
- Corus (mythology)
- Corybas (mythology)
- Corycia
- Corydallus
- Coryphaeus
- Corythus
- Corythus (son of Paris)
- Cothocidae
- Cotyla
- Cotyttia
- Counter-Earth
- Cragaleus
- Cranaus
- Crantor
- Crantor (mythology)
- Craterus' ex voto
- Crates (engineer)
- Crates of Athens
- Crates of Mallus
- Crates of Thebes
- Crateuas (physician)
- Cratinus
- Cratippus of Athens
- Cratippus of Pergamon
- Cratylus
- Cratylus (dialogue)
- Creon (king of Corinth)
- Creon (king of Thebes)
- Creonion
- Creophylus of Samos
- Crepidoma
- Cres
- Cresphontes
- Crestonia
- Cretan archers
- Cretan Bull
- Cretans (play)
- Cretan War (205–200 BC)
- Crete
- Crete (mythology)
- Cretea
- Cretheus
- Crethon
- Creusa
- Creusa (Naiad)
- Creusa of Athens
- Creusa of Corinth
- Creusa of Troy
- Criasus
- Crinacus
- Crinaeae
- Crinagoras of Mytilene
- Crinis
- Crino
- Crioa (Attica)
- Crissa
- Crisus
- Critheïs
- Crithote (Thrace)
- Critias
- Critias (dialogue)
- Crito
- Crito of Alopece
- Critodemus
- Critolaos of Megalopolis
- Critolaus
- Criton of Heraclea
- Criton of Pieria
- Crius
- Croatian Apoxyomenos
- Crobylus
- Crocus (mythology)
- Croeseid
- Croesus
- Crommyonian Sow
- Cropia (Attica)
- Crotalum
- Crotopus
- Crouching Satyr Eye-Cup
- Crypteia
- Ctesias
- Ctesibius
- Ctesicles
- Ctesilochus
- Ctesippus
- Ctesylla
- Ctimene
- Cuarius (Boeotia)
- Cult of Artemis at Brauron
- Cult of Dionysus
- Cultural depictions of Medusa and Gorgons
- Cumae
- Curetes (tribe)
- Cyamites
- Cyaneae
- Cyanippus
- Cyanippus (son of Pharax)
- Cybele
- Cychreides
- Cychreus
- Cycliadas
- Cyclic Poets
- Cyclopean masonry
- Cyclopes
- Cyclops (play)
- Cycnus
- Cycnus of Aetolia
- Cycnus of Kolonai
- Cycnus of Liguria
- Cycnus (son of Ares)
- Cydantidae
- Cydathenaeum
- Cydias
- Cydippe (Rhodes)
- Cydon
- Cylarabes
- Cylix of Apollo
- Cyllarus
- Cyllene (Elis)
- Cyllene (nymph)
- Cylon of Athens
- Cynaegirus
- Cynaethus
- Cynegeticus
- Cynicism (philosophy)
- Cynisca
- Cynortas
- Cynosarges
- Cynosura (Laconia)
- Cynosura (nymph)
- Cynurus
- Cynus
- Cyparissus
- Cyparissus (Phocis)
- Cyphus
- Cypria
- Cypriot Bichrome ware
- Cypselus
- Cyrenaics
- Cyrene
- Cyropaedia
- Cythera
- Cytherus
- Cytinium
- Cytissorus
- Cytorus
- Cyzicus

== D ==
- Dactyls
- Daduchos
- Daedala
- Daedalidae
- Daedalion
- Daedalus
- Daemon
- Daemones Ceramici
- Daetor
- Daidala
- Daiphron
- Demaratus
- Damarchus
- Damasen
- Damasichthon
- Damasichthon (King of Thebes)
- Damasithymus
- Damastor
- Demetrius of Phalerum
- Damo
- Damocles
- Damocrates
- Demodocus (dialogue)
- Damon and Pythias
- Damon of Athens
- Damysus
- Danaë
- Danaïdes
- Danais (epic)
- Danais (mythology)
- Danake
- Danaus
- Dancer of Pergamon
- Dancers of Delphi
- Dancing Satyr of Mazara del Vallo
- Dandes of Argos
- Daphne
- Daphnephoria
- Daphnis
- Daphnus
- Dardanian invasion of Epirus
- Dardanians
- Dardanus (mythology)
- Dardanus (Scythian king)
- Dardanus (son of Zeus)
- Dardanus of Athens
- Dares Phrygius
- Darius Painter
- Darius Vase
- Dascylium (Caria)
- Dascylus
- Dexaroi
- Data (Euclid)
- Daulis
- Daulis (mythology)
- Daybreak Painter
- De genio Socratis
- De Interpretatione
- Death in ancient Greek art
- Decelea
- Deception of Zeus
- Declension of Greek nouns in Latin
- Decline of Greco-Roman polytheism
- Decree of Aristoteles
- Decree of Dionysopolis
- Decree of Philippi
- Decree of Philippi, 242 BCE
- Decree of Themistocles
- Dedication of Nikandre
- Defeat of Leonnatus by Antiphilus
- Deferent and epicycle
- Definitions (Plato)
- Deianira
- Deidamia (mythology)
- Deidamia of Scyros
- Deileon
- Deimachus
- Deimachus (mythology)
- Deimos (deity)
- Deinomenes
- Deinomenes (sculptor)
- Deiochus
- Deioneus
- Deiopites
- Deiphobus
- Deiphontes
- Deipneus
- Deipnon
- Deipylus
- Deipyrus
- Deiradiotae
- Delian League
- Delium
- Delos
- Delphi
- Delphi Inscription
- Delphic Hymns
- Delphic maxims
- Delphic Sibyl
- Delphinia
- Delphinion
- Delphus
- Delphyne
- Delta (letter)
- Demaenetus
- Demaratus
- Demarchos
- Deme
- Demeter
- Demeter of Knidos
- Demetrius (somatophylax)
- Demetrius (son of Althaemenes)
- Demetrius (son of Pythonax)
- Demetrius of Alopece
- Demetrius of Amphipolis
- Demetrius of Magnesia
- Demetrius of Phalerum
- Demetrius of Scepsis
- Demetrius the Cynic
- Demetrius Lacon
- Demiurge
- Demiurge (magistrate)
- Democedes
- Demochares
- Democles
- Democoon
- Democrates
- Democrates of Aphidna
- Democritus
- Demodocus
- Demoleon
- Demoleon (mythology)
- Demoleus
- Demonax
- Demonax (lawmaker)
- Demonice of Aetolia
- Demonicus of Pella
- Demophilus of Thespiae
- Demophon (seer)
- Demophon of Athens
- Demophon of Elaeus
- Demophon of Eleusis
- Demoptolemus
- Demosthenes
- Demosthenes (general)
- Demosthenes Philalethes
- Depictions of the sacrifice of Iphigenia
- Dercylidas
- Dereium
- Derveni Krater
- Derveni papyrus
- Descent of Perithous
- Desmon of Corinth
- Despinis Head
- Despoina
- Deucalion
- Deucalion (mythology)
- Deucalion (son of Minos)
- Deuteragonist
- Dexagoridas
- Dexamenus
- Dexippus
- Dexippus of Cos
- Dexithea (mythology)
- Dia (mythology)
- Dia (wife of Ixion)
- Diacria
- Diacria (Euboea)
- Diades of Pella
- Diadochi
- Diadumenos
- Diaeus
- Diagoras of Melos
- Diagoras of Rhodes
- Diairesis
- Dialogues of the Gods
- Dialogues of the Sea Gods
- Diana of Gabii
- Dianoia
- Diaphorus (mythology)
- Dias (mythology)
- Diateichisma
- Diaulos (architecture)
- Diaulos (instrument)
- Diaulos (running race)
- Dicaearchus
- Dicaearchus of Aetolia
- Dicaeus
- Dictys
- Didascaly
- Didyma
- Didymus Chalcenterus
- Didymus the Musician
- Dienekes
- Dieuches
- Digamma
- Diipetes
- Dikastes
- Dike
- Diliad
- Dimachae
- Dimoetes
- Dinarchus
- Dinocrates
- Dinon
- Dinos
- Dinos of the Gorgon Painter
- Dinos Painter
- Dinostratus
- Dio of Alexandria
- Diocles
- Diocles (mathematician)
- Diocles of Carystus
- Diocles of Cnidus
- Diocles of Corinth
- Diocles of Magnesia
- Diocles of Syracuse
- Diocorystes
- Diodorus Cronus
- Diodorus of Adramyttium
- Diodorus of Alexandria
- Diodorus of Aspendus
- Diodorus of Tyre
- Diodorus Siculus
- Diodotus (son of Eucrates)
- Diodotus the Stoic
- Diodotus Tryphon
- Dioedas
- Diogenes
- Diogenes and Alexander
- Diogenes Laërtius
- Diogenes of Apollonia
- Diogenes of Athens (sculptor)
- Diogenes of Athens (tragedian)
- Diogenes of Babylon
- Diogenes of Oenoanda
- Diogenes of Phoenicia
- Diogenes of Seleucia
- Diogenes of Tarsus
- Diogenianus
- Diolkos
- Diomea (Attica)
- Diomede
- Diomedes
- Diomedes of Thrace
- Diomus (mythology)
- Dion
- Dion, Pieria
- Dione (mythology)
- Dione (Titaness)
- Dionysia
- Dionysiakos
- Dionysian Mysteries
- Dionysius (ambassador)
- Dionysius (Athenian commander)
- Dionysius Chalcus
- Dionysius of Byzantium
- Dionysius of Chalcedon
- Dionysius of Cyrene
- Dionysius of Halicarnassus
- Dionysius of Lamptrai
- Dionysius of Miletus
- Dionysius the Phocaean
- Dionysius the Renegade
- Dionysius Thrax
- Dionysodorus
- Dionysodorus (sophist)
- Dionysus
- Dionysus Aesymnetes
- Dionysus Cup
- Dionysus in comparative mythology
- Diopeithes
- Dioplethes
- Diores
- Dioscorides (Stoic)
- Diosphos Painter
- Diotima of Mantinea
- Diotima's Ladder of Love
- Diotimus the Stoic
- Dioxippe
- Dioxippus
- Diphilus
- Diphilus (physician)
- Diphridas
- Diphros
- Diple (textual symbol)
- Dipoenus and Scyllis
- Dipylon Amphora
- Dipylon inscription
- Dipylon krater
- Dipylon Master
- Dirce
- Disciples of Plotinus
- Discobolus
- Discophoros
- Discourses of Epictetus
- Dissoi logoi
- Distyle
- Distyle in antis
- Dithyramb
- Dium (Crete)
- Dium (Euboea)
- Dius
- Diyllus
- Dochmiac
- Dodona
- Dodona (Thessaly)
- Dodone
- Dodonian Zeus
- Dodwell Painter
- Dogmatic school
- Dokimasia
- Dokimasia Painter
- Dolichos (race)
- Doliones
- Dolius
- Dolon
- Dolops
- Dorian invasion
- Dorians
- Doric Greek
- Doric Hexapolis
- Doric order
- Doric Tetrapolis
- Dorieus
- Doris (Greece)
- Doris (mythology)
- Doris (Oceanid)
- Dorium
- Dorus (Deucalionid)
- Dorus (mythology)
- Dory
- Doryclus
- Doryphoros
- Doryssus
- Douris (vase painter)
- Dracanum
- Dracius
- Draco (lawgiver)
- Draco (physician)
- Draconian constitution
- Dragon's teeth (mythology)
- Dragons in Greek mythology
- Drakaina
- Dreros inscription
- Droop cup
- Drosera (naiad)
- Dryad
- Dryas (mythology)
- Dryas of Calydon
- Dryope
- Dryope (daughter of Dryops)
- Dryopes
- Dryops (mythology)
- Dryops of Oeta
- Duel Painter
- Dulichium
- Duris of Samos
- Dymas
- Dyme
- Dynamene
- Dyscrasia
- Dyskolos
- Dysnomia (deity)
- Dyssebeia

== E ==
- Eagle of Zeus
- Earliest Greek democracies
- Early life of Plato
- Earth (classical element)
- Earth and water
- East Greek Bird Bowl
- East Greek vase painting
- Eastern pediment of the Temple of Zeus at Olympia
- Ecbasus
- Ecclesia
- Ecdysia
- Echea
- Echecrates
- Echecrates of Phlius
- Echecrates of Thessaly
- Echecratides
- Echedemos
- Echelidae
- Echembrotus
- Echemeia
- Echemmon
- Echemus
- Echephron
- Echestratus
- Echetlus
- Echetus
- Echidna
- Echion
- Echion (painter)
- Echius
- Echo (mythology)
- Echo Stoa
- Echthroi
- Eclectic school
- Economics (Aristotle)
- Economy of ancient Greece
- Ecphantus the Pythagorean
- Ectenes
- Ecumene
- Edinburgh Painter
- Edonis
- Education in ancient Greece
- Eetion
- Eetion (mythology)
- Ego eimi
- Eidolon
- Eidothea
- Eikas
- Eikasia
- Eileithyia
- Eilesium
- Eilissus
- Eion
- Eion (Argolis)
- Eioneus
- Eirene (artist)
- Eirene (goddess)
- Eiresidae
- Eiresione
- Eiron
- Eitea (Acamantis)
- Eitea (Antiochis)
- Ekdromoi
- Ekecheiria
- Ekklesiasterion
- Ekkyklema
- Ekphrasis
- Ekpyrosis
- Elaea (Epirus)
- Elaea (mythology)
- Elaeus (Aetolia)
- Elaeus (Attica)
- Elaeus (Epirus)
- Elaphebolia
- Elasioi
- Elasippus
- Elate
- Elateia
- Elateia (Epirus)
- Elatus
- Elbows Out
- Eleatics
- Electra
- Electra (Euripides play)
- Electra (Greek mythology)
- Electra (Oceanid)
- Electra (Pleiad)
- Electra (Sophocles play)
- Electryon
- Electryone
- Eleius
- Eleon
- Eleos
- Elephantis
- Elephenor
- Eleusinian Mysteries
- Eleusinian Mysteries Hydria
- Eleusinion
- Eleusis
- Eleusis (Boeotia)
- Eleusis (mythology)
- Eleusis Amphora
- Eleuther
- Eleutheria
- Eleutherna Bridge
- Elgin Amphora
- Elgin Marbles
- Elimiotis
- Elis (city)
- Ellopia
- Elone
- Elpenor
- Elpinice
- Elpinice (daughter of Herodes Atticus)
- Elpis
- Elymus
- Elyrus
- Elysium
- Emathion
- Empedocles
- Empiric school
- Empusa
- Enalus
- Enarephoros
- Enarete
- Enceladus (giant)
- Enchiridion of Epictetus
- Endeïs
- Endius
- Endoeus
- Endoxa
- Endymion
- Enipeus
- Enispe
- Ennomus
- Enodia
- Enope (Greece)
- Enorches
- Entochus
- Enyalius
- Enyeus
- Enyo
- Eordaea
- Eos
- Epacria
- Epactaeus
- Epaminondas
- Epaphus
- Epeigeus
- Epeius
- Epeius of Phocis
- Eperatus
- Ephebic oath
- Ephectics
- Ephesia Grammata
- Ephesian school
- Ephesus
- Ephialtes
- Ephialtes of Trachis
- Ephor
- Ephorus
- Ephyra (Aetolia)
- Ephyra (Elis)
- Epiales
- Epic Cycle
- Epicaste
- Epicephisia
- Epicharmus of Kos
- Epicles (admiral)
- Epicles
- Epicrates of Ambracia
- Epicrates of Athens
- Epictetus
- Epicurea
- Epicureanism
- Epicurus
- Epidamnos
- Epidaurus
- Epidaurus (mythology)
- Epidaurus Limera
- Epideictic
- Epidoseis
- Epidotes
- Epieicidae
- Epigamia
- Epigenes, son of Antiphon
- Epigenes of Athens
- Epigenes of Byzantium
- Epigenes of Sicyon
- Epigeus
- Epigoni
- Epigoni (epic)
- Epigoni (play)
- Epigonion
- Epigonus
- Epigonus of Ambracia
- Epigram of Amazaspos
- Epigrams (Homer)
- Epigrams (Plato)
- Epihipparch
- Epikleros
- Epiktetos
- Epilaus
- Epilogism
- Epimachus of Athens
- Epimeliad
- Epimenides
- Epimetheus
- Epinetron
- Epinicus
- Epinikion
- Epinomis
- Epione
- Epiphanius of Petra
- Epiphany
- Epiphron
- Epipole of Carystus
- Epirote League
- Epirus (ancient state)
- Epirus (mythology)
- Episkopoi
- Episkyros
- Epistates
- Episteme
- Epistles (Plato)
- Epistrategos
- Epistrophus
- Epitadeus
- Epitasis
- Epitelidas of Laconia
- Epithalamium
- Epithets in Homer
- Epitrepontes
- Epizelus
- Epoché
- Epochus
- Epode
- Eponymous archon
- Epopeus
- Epopeus (king of Sicyon)
- Epsilon
- Equatorial ring
- Erasinides
- Erasinos
- Erasistratus
- Erastus of Scepsis
- Erato
- Erato (dryad)
- Erato (mythology)
- Eratosthenes (statesman)
- Erchia
- Erechtheion
- Erechtheis
- Erechtheus
- Eretria Painter
- Eretrian school
- Ereuthalion
- Ereuthus
- Erginus
- Erginus (Argonaut)
- Erginus (king of Minyans)
- Ergiscus
- Ergoteles (potter)
- Ergoteles of Himera
- Ergotimos
- Eriboea
- Eribotes
- Ericea
- Erichthonius of Athens
- Erichthonius of Dardania
- Eridanos
- Erigyius
- Erikepaios
- Erineus (city)
- Erinna
- Erinoma
- Erinyes
- Eriopis
- Eris
- Erodius
- Eroeadae (Antiochis)
- Eroeadae (Hippothontis)
- Eromenos
- Eros
- Eros (concept)
- Erotes
- Erotianus
- Ersa
- Erymanthian Boar
- Erymanthus
- Erymneus
- Erysichthon of Attica
- Erysichthon of Thessaly
- Erytheia
- Erytheia (mythology)
- Erythrae (Boeotia)
- Erythrae (Locris)
- Erythraea (Crete)
- Erythraean Sibyl
- Erythras
- Eryx (mythology)
- Eryx (king of Sicily)
- Eryxias (dialogue)
- Eryximachus
- Eta
- Eteocles
- Eteocles of Orchomenus
- Eteoclus
- Eteoneus
- Eteonicus
- Ethos
- Euaemon
- Euaeon of Lampsacus
- Eualcides
- Euboea
- Euboea (mythology)
- Euboean League
- Euboean vase painting
- Eubuleus
- Eubulides
- Eubulus (banker)
- Eubulus (poet)
- Eubulus (statesman)
- Eucharides Painter
- Eucheirus
- Euchenor
- Eucleia
- Eucleidas
- Eucleides
- Euclid
- Euclid's Elements
- Euclid's Optics
- Euclid of Megara
- Euclidean algorithm
- Euclidean geometry
- Euctemon
- Eudaemon
- Eudaimonia
- Eudamidas I
- Eudamidas II
- Eudamidas III
- Eudemian Ethics
- Eudemus
- Eudemus of Rhodes
- Eudoros
- Eudorus of Alexandria
- Eudoxus of Cnidus
- Eudoxus of Cyzicus
- Euenus
- Euergetes
- Euhemerus
- Euippe
- Euippe (daughter of Tyrimmas)
- Eukarpia
- Eulabeia (mythology)
- Eulamius
- Eumaeus
- Eumedes
- Eumelus
- Eumelus of Corinth
- Eumenes
- Eumolpidae
- Eumolpus
- Eunapius
- Euneus
- Eunicus
- Eunoia
- Eunomia
- Eunomus (admiral)
- Eunomus (king of Sparta)
- Eunostus
- Eunostus (hero)
- Eupalamus
- Eupalinos
- Eupatridae
- Eupeithes
- Euphantus
- Eupheme
- Euphemus
- Euphemus (mythology)
- Euphiletos Painter
- Euphiletos Painter Panathenaic prize amphora
- Euphorbos plate
- Euphorbus
- Euphorbus (physician)
- Euphorion
- Euphorion (playwright)
- Euphorion of Chalcis
- Euphraeus
- Euphranor
- Euphrates the Stoic
- Euphron
- Euphronios
- Euphronios Krater
- Euphrosyne
- Eupolemeia
- Eupolis
- Eupompus
- Euporia
- Eupraxia
- Eupyridae
- Eureka (word)
- Euripides
- Euripus (Acarnania)
- Euroea
- Europa (consort of Zeus)
- Europa (mythology)
- Europs (mythology)
- Eurotas
- Eurus
- Euryale (Gorgon)
- Euryalus
- Euryalus (Phaeacian)
- Euryanassa
- Eurybarus
- Eurybates
- Eurybatus
- Eurybia
- Eurybiades
- Eurybius
- Eurybotas
- Eurybus of Athens
- Eurycleia of Ithaca
- Euryclids
- Eurycrates
- Eurycratides
- Eurycyda
- Eurydamas
- Eurydice
- Eurydice (daughter of Adrastus)
- Eurydice (mythology)
- Eurydice of Argos
- Eurydice of Mycenae
- Eurydice of Pylos
- Eurydice of Thebes
- Euryleonis
- Eurylochus of Same
- Eurymachus
- Eurymachus (Odyssey)
- Eurymedon (mythology)
- Eurymedon (strategos)
- Eurymedon of Myrrhinus
- Eurymedon the Hierophant
- Eurymedon vase
- Eurymedousa
- Eurymenae (Epirus)
- Eurymenes
- Eurynome
- Eurynome (Oceanid)
- Eurynome of Megara
- Eurynomos (daemon)
- Eurynomus
- Euryphon
- Eurypon
- Eurypyle
- Eurypylus
- Eurypylus of Cos
- Eurypylus of Cyrene
- Eurypylus of Thessaly
- Eurypylus (son of Telephus)
- Eurysaces
- Eurysthenes
- Eurysthenes (Pergamon)
- Eurystheus
- Eurythemista
- Eurytion
- Eurytion (king of Phthia)
- Eurytios Krater
- Eurytus
- Eurytus (Pythagorean)
- Eurytus of Sparta
- Eurytus and Cteatus
- Eurytus of Oechalia
- Eusebeia
- Eusorus
- Eustathius of Cappadocia
- Euterpe
- Euthenia
- Euthydemus (dialogue)
- Euthydemus (Socratic literature)
- Euthydemus (tyrant)
- Euthydemus of Chios
- Euthydikos Kore
- Euthymenes
- Euthymia (philosophy)
- Euthymides
- Euthyna
- Euthynteria
- Euthyphro
- Euthyphro (prophet)
- Euthyphro dilemma
- Eutocius of Ascalon
- Eutrapelia
- Eutresis (Boeotia)
- Eutresis culture
- Eutychides
- Eutychius Proclus
- Euxantius
- Euxippe
- Euxynthetus
- Evadne
- Evaechme
- Evagoras
- Evander (philosopher)
- Evenius
- Evenor
- Evenus
- Evenus of Aetolia
- Ever to Excel
- Everes
- Evippus
- Ex voto of the Lacaedemonians
- Exeligmos
- Exekias
- Exomis
- Expansion of Macedonia under Philip II
- Ex voto of the Arcadians
- Eye-cup

== F ==
- Family tree of the Greek gods
- Fiction set in ancient Greece
- Fifth-century Athens
- Fire (classical element)
- First Alcibiades
- First Ancient Theatre, Larissa
- First Battle of Lamia
- First declension
- First Macedonian War
- First Messenian War
- First Peloponnesian War
- First Persian invasion of Greece
- First Philippic
- First Sacred War
- Fish plate
- Food and diet in ancient medicine
- For Phormion
- Forced suicide
- Foreign War
- Form of the Good
- Fortunate Isles
- Foundry Painter
- Four causes
- Fourth Macedonian War
- Fourth Philippic
- Fragment from the tomb of Nikarete
- François Vase
- Free will in antiquity
- Fronto of Emesa
- Funeral games
- Funeral oration
- Funerary monument for an athlete
- Funerary naiskos of Demetria and Pamphile

== G ==
- Gaddi Torso
- Gadfly (mythology)
- Gaia
- Galanthis
- Galatea (mythological statue)
- Galatea (mythology)
- Galaton
- Gale
- Galene
- Gamelia
- Gamma
- Ganymede
- Gargareans
- Gargettus
- Garum
- Gastraphetes
- Gate of Athena Archegetis
- Gates of horn and ivory
- Gegenees
- Geison
- Gela Painter
- Gelanor
- Gello
- Gelon
- Gelon of Laconia
- Gelos
- Geminus
- Gemon
- Generation of Animals
- Genitive absolute
- Genos
- Genus (music)
- Geocentric model
- Geography of the Odyssey
- Geometric art
- Geomori (Athens)
- Geoponici
- Geraestus (Euboea)
- Gerana
- Gerarai
- Geras
- Gerenia
- Gerousia
- Gertus
- Geryon
- Geryoneis
- Getty kouros
- Giants
- Gigantomachy by the Suessula Painter
- Gigonus
- Gitanae
- Gla
- Glaphyrae
- Glauce
- Glaucetas
- Glaucia
- Glaucias (physician, 3rd century BC)
- Glaucias (physician, 4th century BC)
- Glaucias of Aegina
- Glaucias of Athens
- Glaucias of Macedon
- Glaucippe
- Glaucon
- Glaucus
- Glaucus (mythology)
- Glaucus of Carystus
- Glaucus of Chios
- Glaucus of Corinth
- Glaucus of Crete
- Glaucus of Lycia
- Glisas
- Glossary of Stoicism terms
- Glycon of Croton
- Gnathia vases
- Gnesippus
- Gnomic poetry
- Gnosis (artist)
- Golden Bust of Septimius Severus
- Golden Fleece
- Golden mean (philosophy)
- Golden Verses
- Golgos
- Goltyr Painter
- Gongylos
- Gonoessa
- Gordion cup
- Gordius of Cappadocia
- Gorge
- Gorgias
- Gorgias (dialogue)
- Gorgidas
- Gorgo, Queen of Sparta
- Gorgon
- Gorgon Painter
- Gorgoneion
- Gorgoneion Group
- Gorgopas (2nd century BC)
- Gorgopas (4th century BC)
- Gorgophone
- Gorgophone (Perseid)
- Gorgophonus
- Gorgus
- Gorgythion
- Gortyn
- Gortyn code
- Gortyna
- Graea
- Graeae
- Graecians
- Graecus
- Graphe paranomon
- Grave monument from Kallithea
- Grave relief of Thraseas and Euandria
- Grave stele (NAMA 7901)
- Grave Stele of Dexileos
- Grave Stele of Hegeso
- Great Eleusinian Relief
- Great Rhetra
- Greco-Bactrian Kingdom
- Greco-Persian Wars
- Greco-Roman hairstyle
- Greco-Roman relations in classical antiquity
- Greece in the 5th century BC
- Greece in the Roman era
- Greek alphabet
- Greek and Roman artillery
- Greek baths
- Greek Baths in ancient Olympia
- Greek baths of Gela
- Greek chorus
- Greek city-state patron gods
- Greek colonisation
- Greek chorus
- Greek Dark Ages
- Greek democracy
- Greek diacritics
- Greek divination
- Greek drachma
- Greek gardens
- Greek hero cult
- Greek Heroic Age
- Greek inscriptions
- Greek letters used in mathematics, science, and engineering
- Greek love
- Greek lyric
- Greek mathematics
- Greek mythology
- Greek mythology in popular culture
- Greek mythology in western art and literature
- Greek numerals
- Greek orthography
- Greek primordial deities
- Greek riddles
- Greek sea gods
- Greek terracotta figurines
- Greek Theatre of Syracuse
- Greek tragedy
- Greek underworld
- Greek words for love
- Greek wrestling
- Greeks in pre-Roman Gaul
- Griffin Warrior Tomb
- Group E (vase painting)
- Group of Aphrodite, Pan and Eros
- Group of Rhodes 12264
- Gryllus, son of Xenophon
- Gryton
- Guneus
- Gutta
- Gylippus
- Gylis
- Gylon
- Gymnasiarch
- Gymnasium
- Gymnasium at Delphi
- Gymnitae
- Gymnopaedia
- Gynaeconomi
- Gynaecothoenas
- Gyrton (Thessaly)

== H ==
- Hades
- Hadra vase
- Hadrian's Library
- Haemon
- Haemon (mythology)
- Haemus
- Hagius
- Hagnias
- Hagnon of Tarsus
- Hagnon, son of Nikias
- Haimon Painter
- Halae Aexonides
- Halae Araphenides
- Halaesus
- Halasarna
- Halcyon (dialogue)
- Haliacmon (mythology)
- Haliartus
- Halia of Rhodes
- Halie
- Halieia
- Halirrhothius
- Halitherses
- Halizones
- Haloa
- Halteres
- Hamadryad
- Hamartia
- Hamaxantia
- Harma (Attica)
- Harma (Boeotia)
- Harmodius and Aristogeiton
- Harmodius and Aristogeiton (sculpture)
- Harmonia
- Harmost
- Harmothoë
- Harpalion
- Harpalus
- Harpalus (astronomer)
- Harpalus (engineer)
- Harpalus (son of Polemaeus)
- Harpalyce (daughter of Clymenus)
- Harpalyce (daughter of Harpalycus)
- Harpalyce (mythology)
- Harpalykos
- Harpasus
- Harpe
- Harpe (mythology)
- Harpina
- Harpina (city)
- Harpleia
- Harpocration
- Harpy
- Harpy Tomb
- Harrow Painter
- Hasselmann Painter
- Head of a Philosopher
- Hebe (mythology)
- Hecale (Attica)
- Hecale (poem)
- Hecamede
- Hecataeus of Miletus
- Hecate
- Hecaterus
- Hecato of Rhodes
- Hecatomb
- Hecatompedum
- Hecatoncheires
- Hector
- Hecuba
- Hecuba (play)
- Hedea of Tralles
- Hedone
- Hedylogos
- Hegemon of Thasos
- Hegemone
- Hegesandridas
- Hegesias of Cyrene
- Hegesias of Sinope
- Hegesinus of Pergamon
- Hegesippus (orator)
- Hegesippus of Halicarnassus
- Hegesistratus
- Hegetoria
- Hegetorides
- Hegias
- Hegias of Athens
- Heidelberg Painter
- Heimarmene
- Hekatompedon temple
- Helen of Troy
- Helenus
- Helepolis
- Heleus
- Heliadae
- Heliades
- Heliaia
- Heliastic oath
- Helicaon
- Helice (mythology)
- Helike
- Halimus
- Heliocentrism
- Heliodorus (ambassador)
- Heliodorus (metrist)
- Heliodorus (surgeon)
- Heliodorus of Athens
- Heliodorus of Emesa
- Heliodorus of Larissa
- Helios
- Helladic chronology
- Hellanicus (mythology)
- Hellanicus of Lesbos
- Hellanodikai
- Hellas
- Helle
- Hellen
- Hellenic historiography
- Hellenica
- Hellenistic armies
- Hellenistic art
- Hellenistic glass
- Hellenistic Greece
- Hellenistic influence on Indian art
- Hellenistic period
- Hellenistic philosophy
- Hellenistic portraiture
- Hellenistic Prince
- Hellenistic religion
- Hellenistic theatre of Dion
- Hellenization
- Hellenotamiae
- Hellespontine Sibyl
- Hellespontophylakes
- Hellotia
- Helmetheus
- Helos
- Helos (Elis)
- Helots
- Hemera
- Hemithea (mythology)
- Hemithorakion
- Henioche
- Hepatizon
- Hephaestia
- Hephaestio
- Hephaestion (grammarian)
- Hephaestus
- Hera
- Hera Alexandros
- Hera Ammonia
- Heraclea (Acarnania)
- Heraclea in Trachis
- Heraclean Tablets
- Heracleia (festival)
- Heracleides (409 BC)
- Heracleides (415 BC)
- Heracleides (admiral)
- Heracleides (ambassador)
- Heracleides of Byzantium
- Heracleides of Cyme
- Heracleides of Ephesus
- Heracleides of Gyrton
- Heracleides of Maroneia
- Heracleides of Mylasa
- Heracleides of Tarentum
- Heracleides the Phocian
- Heracles
- Heracles of Antikythera
- Heracles Papyrus
- Heracles Patroos
- Heraclidae
- Heraclides (painter)
- Heraclides (physician)
- Heraclides of Aenus
- Heraclides of Erythrae
- Heraclides of Smyrna
- Heraclides of Tarentum
- Heraclides of Tarsus
- Heraclides Ponticus
- Heraclitus
- Heraclitus (commentator)
- Heraclitus the Paradoxographer
- Heraclius the Cynic
- Heraea (Arcadia)
- Heraean Games
- Heraeum (Thrace)
- Heraion of Argos
- Heraion of Perachora
- Heraion of Samos
- Heraklas
- Herakles (Euripides)
- Herald and Trumpet contest
- Hercules and the lion of Nemea (Louvre Museum, L 31 MN B909)
- Hercules and the Wagoner
- Hercules at the crossroads
- Herillus
- Herm (sculpture)
- Hermaea
- Hermagoras of Amphipolis
- Hermaphroditus
- Hermarchus
- Hermeneumata
- Hermes
- Hermes and the Infant Dionysus
- Hermes Criophorus (Athens)
- Hermes Logios type
- Hermes Ludovisi
- Hermes of Aegium
- Hermes of Andros
- Hermes of Messene
- Hermes Trismegistus
- Hermias of Atarneus
- Hermione (Argolis)
- Hermione (mythology)
- Hermippe
- Hermippus
- Hermippus of Berytus
- Hermippus of Smyrna
- Hermocrates
- Hermocrates (dialogue)
- Hermodike I
- Hermodike II
- Hermodorus
- Hermodorus of Salamis
- Hermogenes (philosopher)
- Hermogenes (potter)
- Hermogenes of Priene
- Hermonax
- Hermotimus of Clazomenae
- Hermotimus of Pedasa
- Hermus
- Hermus (Attica)
- Hero
- Hero and Leander
- Herodicus
- Herodorus
- Herodorus of Megara
- Herodotus
- Herodotus (physician)
- Heroic nudity
- Heroön
- Heroon at Nemea
- Herophilos
- Herophon
- Herostratus
- Herpyllis
- Herse
- Herse of Athens
- Hesiod
- Hesione
- Hesione (mythology)
- Hesione (Oceanid)
- Hesperia
- Hesperides
- Hesperis
- Hesperus
- Hessus (Locris)
- Hestia
- Hestiaea (Attica)
- Hestiaeus of Perinthus
- Hesychius of Alexandria
- Hetaira
- Hicesius
- Hicetaon
- Hicetas
- Hicetas of Leontini
- Hiera Orgas
- Hierapytna
- Hierax (mythology)
- Hierax (Spartan admiral)
- Hiereiai
- Hiero (Xenophon)
- Hierocles (Stoic)
- Hieromenia
- Hieromneme
- Hieronymus of Cardia
- Hieronymus of Rhodes
- Hierophant
- Hierophylakes
- Hieropoios
- Hieros gamos
- High Priestess of Athena Polias
- Hilaeira
- Himation
- Himeraeus
- Hippalcimus
- Hippalectryon
- Hippalus
- Hipparchia of Maroneia
- Hipparchic cycle
- Hipparchicus
- Hipparchus
- Hipparchus (brother of Hippias)
- Hipparchus (cavalry officer)
- Hipparchus (dialogue)
- Hippasus
- Hippasus (mythology)
- Hippe
- Hippeis
- Hippias
- Hippias (tyrant)
- Hippias Major
- Hippias Minor
- Hippo (philosopher)
- Hippobotus
- Hippocampus
- Hippocleides
- Hippocoon
- Hippocoon of Sparta
- Hippocrates
- Hippocrates, father of Peisistratos
- Hippocrates (physicians)
- Hippocrates of Athens
- Hippocrates of Chios
- Hippocrates of Gela
- Hippocratic bench
- Hippocratic Corpus
- Hippocratic Oath
- Hippocrene
- Hippodamas
- Hippodamia (mythology)
- Hippodamia (daughter of Oenomaus)
- Hippodamia (wife of Autonous)
- Hippodamia (wife of Pirithous)
- Hippodamus of Miletus
- Hippodrome
- Hippodrome of Olympia
- Hippolochus (mythology)
- Hippolochus of Troy
- Hippolyta
- Hippolyte
- Hippolytus (mythology)
- Hippolytus (play)
- Hippolytus (son of Theseus)
- Hippomedon
- Hippomedon of Sparta
- Hippomedon (Seven against Thebes)
- Hippomenes
- Hipponax
- Hipponicus III
- Hipponous
- Hippotae
- Hippotes
- Hippothoe
- Hippothoon
- Hippothous
- Hippotion
- Hippotomadae
- Histiaeotis
- Histiaeus
- Historia Plantarum (Theophrastus book)
- Historicity of the Homeric epics
- Histories (Herodotus)
- History of Animals
- History of Athens
- History of Crete
- History of ethics in Ancient Greece
- History of Greece
- History of Greek and Hellenistic Sicily
- History of Macedonia (ancient kingdom)
- History of medicine in Cyprus
- History of Sparta
- History of the Peloponnesian War
- Hodoedocus
- Homados
- Homer
- Homer's Ithaca
- Homeric Greek
- Homeric Hymns
- Homeric prayer
- Homeridae
- Homerus of Byzantium
- Homonoia
- Homonoia (mythology)
- Homosexuality in ancient Greece
- Homosexuality in the militaries of ancient Greece
- Honorary decrees for the Samians
- Hopleus
- Hoplite
- Hoplite formation in art
- Hoplite phalanx
- Hoplitodromos
- Horae
- Horkos
- Horme
- Horsehead Amphora
- Horses Amphora
- Horus (athlete)
- Hubris
- Humorism
- Hyacinth
- Hyacinthia
- Hyacinthus the Lacedaemonian
- Hyades
- Hyagnis
- Hyampolis
- Hyamus
- Hyas
- Hybadae
- Hybrias
- Hybris
- Hybristica
- Hydaspes (mythology)
- Hydna
- Hydraulic telegraph
- Hydraulis
- Hydraulis of Dion
- Hydria
- Hydria (Paros)
- Hyettus
- Hyettus (Boeotia)
- Hygieia
- Hylates
- Hyle
- Hyle (Boeotia)
- Hyle (Locris)
- Hyllus
- Hyllus (mythology)
- Hylomorphism
- Hymn to Dictaean Zeus
- Hymnus
- Hypaethral
- Hypate
- Hypenus of Elis
- Hyperanthes
- Hyperasius
- Hyperbatas
- Hyperbius
- Hyperbolus
- Hyperborea
- Hypereides
- Hypereides (potter)
- Hyperenor
- Hyperes
- Hyperetes
- Hyperion
- Hyperippe
- Hypermnestra
- Hypermnestra (mythology)
- Hypermnestra of Aetolia
- Hyperochus
- Hyperphas
- Hyperuranion
- Hypnos
- Hypobibazon Class
- Hypodiastole
- Hypokeimenon
- Hyporchema
- Hypothesis (drama)
- Hypotrachelium
- Hypsenor
- Hypseus
- Hypsicerus
- Hypsicles
- Hypsipyle
- Hypsipyle (play)
- Hyria (Boeotia)
- Hyrieus
- Hyrmine
- Hyrmine (Elis)
- Hyrtacina
- Hyrtacus
- Hysiae (Argolis)
- Hysiae (Boeotia)
- Hysminai
- Hysmon
- Hysplex

== I ==
- I know that I know nothing
- Iacchus
- Ialemus
- Ialmenus
- Ialysos (mythology)
- Ialysus
- Iambe
- Iamenus
- Iamidai
- Iamus
- Ianeira
- Iapetus
- Iapyx
- Iardanus
- Iardanus of Lydia
- Iasion
- Iaso
- Iasus
- Iasus (king of Argos)
- Iatromantis
- Ibycus
- Icaria (Attica)
- Icarius
- Icarius (Athenian)
- Icarius (Spartan)
- Icarius of Hyperesia
- Icarus
- Iccus of Taranto
- Ichnaea
- Ichneutae
- Ichor
- Ichthyas
- Ichthyocentaurs
- Ictinus
- Ictinus (mythology)
- Ida
- Ida (mother of Minos)
- Ida (nurse of Zeus)
- Idaea
- Idaean Dactyls
- Idalion Tablet
- Idas
- Idas (mythology)
- Idmon
- Idmon (Argonaut)
- Idomeneus of Crete
- Idomeneus of Lampsacus
- Idrias
- Idyia
- Idyma
- Iliad
- Ilione
- Ilioneus
- Ilioupersis Painter
- Ilium (Epirus)
- Iliupersis
- Illyrian type helmet
- Illyrian weaponry
- Illyrius
- Ilus
- Ilus (son of Dardanus)
- Ilus (son of Tros)
- Imagines (work by Philostratus)
- Imbrex and tegula
- Imbrius
- Imbrus
- Immaradus
- Impluvium
- Inachorium
- Inachus
- Inatus
- Incomposite interval
- Indica (Arrian)
- Indica (Ctesias)
- Indo-Greek Kingdom
- Infinitive
- Ino
- Interpretation of Dreams (Antiphon)
- Invasions of Epidamnus
- Io
- Iobates
- Iodame
- Ioke
- Iolaidas of Argos
- Iolaus
- Iolcus
- Iole
- Ion
- Ion (dialogue)
- Ion (play)
- Ion of Chios
- Ionian League
- Ionian Revolt
- Ionian School (philosophy)
- Ionians
- Ionic Greek
- Ionic order
- Ionic vase painting
- Ionidae
- Ionides
- Iophon
- Iota
- Iota subscript
- Iphianassa
- Iphianassa (daughter of Agamemnon)
- Iphianeira
- Iphicles
- Iphiclus
- Iphicrates
- Iphidamas
- Iphigenia
- Iphigenia in Aulis
- Iphigenia in Tauris
- Iphimedeia
- Iphinoe
- Iphis
- Iphis (mythology)
- Iphistiadae
- Iphito
- Iphitos
- Iphitus of Oechalia
- Iphthime
- Ipnus
- Ipotane
- Ira (Messenia)
- Iris
- Iron Age Greek migrations
- Irus
- Isaeus
- Isagoras
- Ischys
- Isindus
- Ismarus (Thrace)
- Ismene
- Ismene (Asopid)
- Ismenias
- Ismenis
- Ismenus
- Isocrates
- Isonoe
- Isopoliteia
- Issa (mythology)
- Istasus
- Isthmia (ancient city)
- Isthmian Games
- Istron
- Istrus (mythology)
- Isus
- Isus (Boeotia)
- Isus (Megaris)
- Isyllus
- Italian school (philosophy)
- Italus
- Ithaca
- Ithaca (polis)
- Ithome
- Ithome (Thessaly)
- Ithoria
- Iton (Thessaly)
- Itonia
- Itonus
- Itylus
- Itys
- Ixion
- Iynx

== J ==
- Jar (pelike) with Odysseus and Elpenor
- Jason
- Jason of Nysa
- Jena Painter
- Jocasta
- Jockey of Artemision
- Judgement of Paris
- Judgement of Paris Amphora
- Julianus the Egyptian

== K ==
- Kabiria Group
- Kachrylion
- Kai
- Kairos
- Kakia
- Kakodaimonistai
- Kalamos
- Kale
- Kalos inscription
- Kalos kagathos
- Kamares ware
- Kamira
- Kanathos
- Kandaulos
- Kanephoros
- Kantharos
- Kapheleis
- Kappa
- Karamuza
- Karbasyanda
- Kardaki Temple
- Karpion
- Karpos
- Kasolaba
- Kassel cup
- Kasta Tomb
- Katabasis
- Katakekaumene
- Katalepsis
- Kathekon
- Katolophyromai
- Kaunos
- Kausia
- Kerameikos
- Kerameikos steles
- Kerch style
- Keres
- Kernos
- Kerykes
- Kestros (weapon)
- Khalkotauroi
- Kheriga
- Khôra
- Kiln
- King Teucer
- Kladeos
- Klazomenai
- Klazomenian sarcophagi
- Klazomenian vase painting
- Kleino (musician)
- Kleitias
- Kleitomachos (athlete)
- Kleobis and Biton
- Kleophon Painter
- Kleophrades Painter
- Kleophrades Painter Panathenaic prize amphora
- Kleos
- Kleroterion
- Klismos
- Knossos
- Know thyself
- Koalemos
- Kobalos
- Kodapeis
- Koine Greek
- Koine Greek grammar
- Koinon
- Koinon of Macedonians
- Kolakretai
- Koliorga
- Kollyra curse tablet
- Kolonai
- Kolonos Hill
- Kolpos
- Komast cup
- Kommos (theatre)
- Komos
- Konos
- Kopis
- Kora of Sicyon
- Korai of Ionia
- Korai of the Acropolis of Athens
- Kore (sculpture)
- Kore of Lyons
- Korkyra (mythology)
- Korkyra (polis)
- Korophaioi
- Korybantes
- Kottabos
- Kotthybos
- Kouloura
- Kourion
- Kouroi of Flerio
- Kouros
- Kouros of Apollonas
- Kouros of Samos
- Kouros of Tenea
- Kourotrophos
- Krater
- Kratos
- Kresilas
- Kriophoros
- Kritios
- Kritios Boy
- Krocylea
- Kroisos Kouros
- Krokinas of Larissa
- Kronia
- Krotos
- KX Painter
- KY Painter
- Kyathos
- Kybernis
- Kydoimos
- Kydonia
- Kykeon
- Kyklos
- Kylix
- Kylix depicting athletic combats by Onesimos
- Kylix depicting Pentathletes
- Kymopoleia
- Kynodesme
- Kyrbas
- Kyrbissos
- Kyrenia ship
- Kyrios

== L ==
- Labda
- Labdacus
- Labotas
- Lacedaemon
- Lacedaemonius
- Lachares
- Laches (dialogue)
- Laches (general)
- Lachesis
- Laciadae
- Laconian vase painting
- Laconic phrase
- Laconicus
- Laconophilia
- Lacrateides Relief
- Lacritus
- Lacydes of Cyrene
- Ladon (mythology)
- Ladromus of Laconia
- Laelaps
- Laertes
- Laestrygon
- Laestrygonians
- Lagoras
- Laïs (physician)
- Laius
- Laius (Crete)
- Lakaina
- Lamachus
- Lamas (mythology)
- Lambda
- Lamedon (mythology)
- Lamian War
- Lamis
- Lamiskos
- Lamon (Crete)
- Lampades
- Lampadephoria
- Lampetia
- Lamponeia
- Lamprocles
- Lamprus
- Lamprus of Erythrae
- Lamptrai
- Lampus
- Land reform in Athens
- Land reform in Sparta
- Laocoön
- Laocoon (mythology)
- Laodamas
- Laodamia
- Laodamia of Phylace
- Laodice (daughter of Priam)
- Laodice (mythology)
- Laodicea (Arcadia)
- Laodocus
- Laomedon
- Laomedon of Mytilene
- Laonome
- Laophonte
- Laophoon
- Laothoe
- Laphria
- Lapithaeum
- Lapithes (hero)
- Lapiths
- Larissa
- Larissa (daughter of Piasus)
- Larnax
- Las
- Las Incantadas
- Lasaea
- Lasion
- Lasthenes (general)
- Lasthenes (Thrace)
- Lasus of Hermione
- Late Greek
- Latmus (town)
- Law court (ancient Athens)
- Law of abode
- Laws (dialogue)
- Leaena
- Leagros Group
- League of Corinth
- League of Free Laconians
- League of the Islanders
- League of the Macedonians
- Learchus
- Lebedus
- Lebes
- Lebes Gamikos
- Lechaeum
- Leda
- Ledon
- Ledra
- Lefkandi
- Leimone
- Leiocritus
- Leitus
- Lekhes
- Lekythos
- Lelante
- Lelantine War
- Lelantos
- Lelex
- Lelex (mythology)
- Lelex of Laconia
- Lelex of Megara
- Lemnian Athena
- Lemnos
- Lenaia
- Lenobius
- Lenormant Athena
- Lenos (Elis)
- Leo (mythology)
- Leo of Phlius
- Leochares
- Leocrates
- Leodamas of Thasos
- Leodes
- Leon (mathematician)
- Leon of Salamis
- Leon of Sparta
- Leonidaion
- Leonidas I
- Leonidas II
- Leonidas (physician)
- Leonidas (sculpture)
- Leonidas of Rhodes
- Leonteus
- Leonteus of Lampsacus
- Leontiades
- Leontiades (Thermopylae)
- Leontichus
- Leontion
- Leontis
- Leophron
- Leos (mythology)
- Leosthenes
- Leosthenes (admiral)
- Leotychidas
- Lepreum
- Lepreus
- Lepsia
- Lepsimandus
- Leptines of Syracuse
- Lerna
- Lernaean Hydra
- Lesbonax
- Lesbos
- Lesche
- Lesche of the Knidians
- Lesches
- Lethe
- Leto
- Leucadius
- Leuce
- Leucippe
- Leucippus
- Leucippus (mythology)
- Leucippus of Crete
- Leucippus of Messenia
- Leucippus of Sicyon
- Leucippus (son of Xanthius)
- Leucon
- Leucone
- Leuconoe (Attica)
- Leucopeus
- Leucothea
- Leucothoe (mythology)
- Leucothoe (daughter of Orchamus)
- Leucus
- Leukaspides
- Libanius
- Libanus
- Libon
- Libya
- Libyan Sibyl
- Lichas
- Lichas (Spartan)
- Licymnius
- Life of Homer (Pseudo-Herodotus)
- Lilaea
- Lilaea (ancient city)
- Lilaeus
- Limenius
- Limnad
- Limnae (Peloponnesus)
- Limnae (Sparta)
- Limnaea (Acarnania)
- Limnaeus
- Limnio
- Limos
- Lindos Chronicle
- Lindus (mythology)
- Linear A
- Linear B
- Linothorax
- Linus (Argive)
- Linus (mythology)
- Linus of Thrace
- Lion Gate
- Lion of Amphipolis
- Lion of Cithaeron
- Lion Painter
- Lip cup
- Lipara (mythology)
- Liriope
- Litae
- Literary topos
- Lithobolos
- Litra
- Little Iliad
- Little-Master cup
- Little Masters
- Liturgy
- Lityerses
- Lochagos
- Lochos
- Locrian Greek
- Locrians
- Locris
- Locrus
- Logographer (legal)
- Logographer (history)
- Logos
- Long Wall (Thracian Chersonese)
- Long Walls
- Longus
- Lopadotemachoselachogaleokranioleipsanodrimhypotrimmatosilphiokarabomelitokatakec hymenokichlepikossyphophattoperisteralektryonoptekephalliokigklopeleiolagoiosiraiobap hetraganopterygon
- Lophis
- Lotus-eaters
- Lotus tree
- Loutrophoros
- Lower Ancyle
- Lower Paeania
- Lower Pergase
- Lower Potamus
- Lucanian vase painting
- Lucian
- Ludovisi Throne
- Lupercus of Berytus
- Lusia (Attica)
- Lycaethus
- Lycaon (king of Arcadia)
- Lycaon (mythology)
- Lycaon (son of Priam)
- Lycaste
- Lycastus
- Lycastus (Crete)
- Lyceum
- Lyceus
- Lycian peasants
- Lyciscus of Messenia
- Lycius (sculptor)
- Lycius (son of Clinis)
- Lyco and Orphe
- Lyco of Iasos
- Lyco of Troas
- Lycomedes
- Lycomedes (mythology)
- Lycomedes of Mantinea
- Lycomedes of Thebes
- Lycophron
- Lycophron (mythology)
- Lycophron (sophist)
- Lycophron of Corinth
- Lycoreia
- Lycorus
- Lyctus
- Lycurgeia
- Lycurgus
- Lycurgus (king of Sparta)
- Lycurgus of Arcadia
- Lycurgus of Athens
- Lycurgus (of Nemea)
- Lycurgus of Sparta
- Lycurgus of Thrace
- Lycus
- Lycus (Thebes)
- Lycus of Euboea
- Lycus of Fortunate Isles
- Lycus of Libya
- Lydiadas of Megalopolis
- Lydion
- Lydos
- Lydus
- Lygdamis of Naxos
- Lykaia
- Lynceus
- Lynceus of Argos
- Lynceus of Messenia
- Lynceus of Samos
- Lyncus
- Lyrceia
- Lyrcus
- Lyrcus (son of Abas)
- Lyre
- Lyrnessus
- Lysander
- Lysianassa
- Lysias
- Lysicles (4th century BC)
- Lysicles (5th century BC)
- Lysidice
- Lysimache
- Lysimachia (Aetolia)
- Lysimachus
- Lysinomus
- Lysippe
- Lysippides Painter
- Lysippos
- Lysis (dialogue)
- Lysis of Taras
- Lysistrata
- Lysistratus
- Lysithea (mythology)
- Lysithous
- Lyssa
- Lysus
- Lyttian War

== M ==
- Macar
- Macareus (son of Aeolus)
- Macareus of Rhodes
- Macaria (daughter of Hades)
- Macaria (daughter of Heracles)
- Macedonia
- Macedonian phalanx
- Macelo (mythology)
- Machai
- Machanidas
- Machaon
- Machatas (sculptor)
- Machatas of Aetolia
- Machatas of Europos
- Macistus
- Macmillan aryballos
- Madrid Painter
- Maeandropolis
- Maenad
- Maenalus (mythology)
- Maenalus (town)
- Maeon
- Maera (hound)
- Magic in the Greco-Roman world
- Magna Graecia
- Magna Moralia
- Magnes (mythology)
- Magnes (comic poet)
- Magnes (son of Aeolus)
- Magnes (son of Argos)
- Magnetes
- Maia
- Makedon
- Makhaira
- Makra Stoa
- Makron
- Malians
- Mamercus of Catane
- Mamertines
- Mandrocleides
- Mandrocles
- Manes of Lydia
- Maniae
- Manika
- Mannerists (Greek vase painting)
- Mantias
- Mantineia
- Mantineia Base
- Mantius
- Manto
- Manto (daughter of Tiresias)
- Manumission inscriptions at Delphi
- Marathon
- Marathon (mythology)
- Marathon Boy
- Marathon tumuli
- Mardonius (general)
- Mardylas
- Mares of Diomedes
- Margites
- Margos
- Mariandynus
- Marianus Scholasticus
- Marinus of Neapolis
- Marion, Cyprus
- Maron
- Maroneia (Attica)
- Marpessa
- Marpessa of Aetolia
- Marpsius
- Marriage in ancient Greece
- Marsyas
- Marsyas Painter
- Marvels (Theopompus)
- Maschalismos
- Mases
- Mask of Agamemnon
- Mastos
- Mastos Painter
- Material monism
- Mathematical text fragment (Berlin, Staatliche Museen, pap. 11529)
- Matton
- Maximus of Tyre
- Meander
- Measurement of a Circle
- Mechane
- Mechanics (Aristotle)
- Mecisteus
- Mecon
- Meda
- Medea
- Medea (play)
- Medeon (Acarnania)
- Medeon (Boeotia)
- Medesicaste
- Medici Vase
- Medimnos
- Medism
- Medius (physician)
- Medius of Larissa
- Medon (mythology)
- Medus
- Medusa
- Megacles
- Megacles of Epirus
- Megaera
- Megala Erga
- Megalai Ehoiai
- Megaletor
- Megalopolis
- Megalostrata (poet)
- Megapenthes
- Megapenthes (son of Menelaus)
- Megapenthes (son of Proetus)
- Megara
- Megareus of Onchestus
- Megareus of Thebes
- Megarian decree
- Megarian school
- Megarian Treasury (Delphi)
- Megarian Treasury (Olympia)
- Megaris
- Megaron
- Megasthenes
- Meges
- Meges of Sidon
- Megistias
- Meidias
- Meidias Painter
- Meilichios
- Melaenae
- Melaina
- Melampodia
- Melampus
- Melaneus (mythology)
- Melaneus of Oechalia
- Melanion (mythology)
- Melanion (son of Amphidamas)
- Melanippe
- Melanippe (daughter of Aeolus)
- Melanippides
- Melanippus
- Melanthius
- Melanthius (Odyssey)
- Melantho
- Melanthus
- Melas
- Meleager
- Meleager of Gadara
- Meleager of Skopas
- Meleager Painter
- Meles (mythology)
- Melete
- Meletus
- Melia (consort of Apollo)
- Melia (consort of Inachus)
- Meliae
- Melian pithamphora
- Melian relief
- Meliboea
- Meliboea of Ephesus
- Melicertes
- Melinoë
- Melisseus
- Melissus of Samos
- Melite (Attica)
- Melite (heroine)
- Melite (mythology)
- Melite (naiad)
- Melos of Delos
- Melpeia
- Melpomene
- Melus
- Members of the Delian League
- Memnon of Rhodes
- Memorabilia (Xenophon)
- Memphis
- Memphis (wife of Epaphus)
- Menaechmus
- Menander
- Menander of Ephesus
- Mene
- Menecrates (sculptor)
- Menecrates of Syracuse
- Menecrates of Tralles
- Menedemus
- Menedemus of Pyrrha
- Menedemus the Cynic
- Menelaion
- Menelaus
- Menelaus (son of Lagus)
- Menelaus of Alexandria
- Menelaus of Pelagonia
- Menemachus
- Menemachus (mythology)
- Menephron
- Menesaechmus
- Menesthes
- Menestheus
- Menesthius
- Menestratus
- Menestratus (Thespiae)
- Menexenus
- Menexenus (dialogue)
- Menippe
- Menippe and Metioche
- Menippean satire
- Menippus
- Menippus (mythology)
- Meniskos
- Meno
- Meno (general)
- Meno's slave
- Menodotus of Nicomedia
- Menoeceus
- Menoetius
- Menon
- Menon I of Pharsalus
- Mental illness in ancient Greece
- Mentes (King of the Cicones)
- Mentes (King of the Taphians)
- Metonic cycle
- Mentor (mythology)
- Mentor (Odyssey)
- Mentor of Rhodes
- Meridarch
- Meriones
- Mermerus
- Mermerus and Pheres
- Merope (daughter of Oenopion)
- Merope (Messenia)
- Merope (mythology)
- Merope (Oedipus)
- Merope (Pleiad)
- Meropis
- Meropis (mythology)
- Merops (king of Aethiopia)
- Merops (mythology)
- Merrythought cup
- Mesangylon
- Mesaulius
- Mese
- Mesoa
- Mesogeia
- Mesogeia Painter
- Messa (Greece)
- Messapian pottery
- Messapian shepherds
- Messene
- Messenia (ancient region)
- Mesthles
- Mestor
- Metabasis paradox
- Metageitnia
- Metagenes
- Metakosmia
- Metamorphoses in Greek mythology
- Metanira
- Metapa
- Metaphysics (Aristotle)
- Metaxy
- Metempsychosis
- Methe
- Methodic school
- Methon
- Metic
- Metion
- Meton of Athens
- Metope
- Metope (mythology)
- Metopes of the Parthenon
- Metretes
- Metrocles
- Metrodora
- Metrodorus (grammarian)
- Metrodorus of Athens
- Metrodorus of Chios
- Metrodorus of Cos
- Metrodorus of Lampsacus (the elder)
- Metrodorus of Lampsacus (the younger)
- Metrodorus of Scepsis
- Metrodorus of Stratonicea
- Metrological Relief
- Metron of Pydna
- Metroon
- Metropolis (Doris)
- Metropolis (Euboea)
- Metropolis (Perrhaebia)
- Metropolis (Thessaly)
- Miasma (Greek mythology)
- Micon
- Micythus
- Middle Gate (Piraeus)
- Middle Platonism
- Mideia
- Midnight poem
- Milesian school
- Milesian tale
- Miletus
- Miletus (mythology)
- Military Decree of Amphipolis
- Military of Mycenaean Greece
- Military tactics in Ancient Greece
- Milk of Hera
- Milo of Croton
- Miltiades
- Miltiades the Elder
- Mimas (Aeneid)
- Mimas (Giant)
- Mimnermus
- Mindarus
- Mines of Laurion
- Minoa
- Minos
- Minos (dialogue)
- Minotaur
- Minthe
- Minyades
- Minyans
- Minyas
- Minyas (poem)
- Misenus
- Misthophoria
- Mithaecus
- Mixing bowl with the exposure of baby Aegisthos
- Mixobarbaroi
- Mixolydian mode
- Mnasagoras
- Mnasippus
- Mnasitheus of Sicyon
- Mnason of Phocis
- Mneme
- Mnemosyne
- Mnesarchus of Athens
- Mnesikles
- Mnesitheus
- Modern understanding of Greek mythology
- Moerocles
- Molon labe
- Molossians
- Molpadia
- Molurus
- Molus (mythology)
- Molus (Argive soldier)
- Molus of Aetolia
- Molus of Crete
- Moly (herb)
- Momus
- Monimus
- Monument of Prusias II
- Monument of the Eponymous Heroes
- The Moon and her Mother
- Mopsus
- Mopsus (Argonaut)
- Mopsus (son of Manto)
- Mora
- Moral intellectualism
- Moria
- Moros
- Morpheus
- Mosaics of Delos
- Moschion (physician)
- Moschion (tragic poet)
- Moschophoros
- Mothax
- Motya Charioteer
- Mount Helicon
- Mount Ida
- Mount Kyllini
- Mount Lykaion
- Mount Oeta
- Mount Olympus
- Mount Parthenion
- Mount Pentelicus
- Mourning Athena
- Movable nu
- Mu (letter)
- Munich Kouros
- Munichia
- Munichia (festival)
- Munichus
- Musaeus of Athens
- Muscle cuirass
- Muses
- Museum of Ancient Greek Technology
- Music of ancient Greece
- Musical system of ancient Greece
- Mycenae
- Mycenae (Crete)
- Mycenaean figurine on tripod
- Mycenaean Greece
- Mycenaean Greek
- Mycenaean palace amphora with octopus (NAMA 6725)
- Mycenaean pottery
- Mycenaean religion
- Mycene
- Mydon
- Mygdon of Bebryces
- Mygdon of Phrygia
- Mygdon of Thrace
- Mygdonia
- Myia
- Myia (mythology)
- Myiagros
- Mykonos
- Mykonos vase
- Myles
- Myma
- Mynes (mythology)
- Myra
- Myrice
- Myrina (priestess)
- Myrmekes
- Myrmex (Attic woman)
- Myrmex
- Myrmidon (hero)
- Myrmidon of Athens
- Myrmidone
- Myrmidons
- Myron
- Myron of Priene
- Myrrhinus
- Myrrhinutta
- Myrsine
- Myrtilus
- Myrtis
- Myrtis of Anthedon
- Myrto
- Myrto (mythology)
- Myscellus
- Mysius
- Myson of Chenae
- Mysus
- Myth of Er
- Mythos (Aristotle)
- Mytilene
- Mytilenean Debate
- Mytilenean revolt

== N ==
- N Painter
- Nabis
- Naiad
- Naiskos
- Naïs
- Name vase
- Names of the Greeks
- Nana
- Napaeae
- Napaeus (mythology)
- Narcissus
- Narycus
- Natural slavery
- Naubolus
- Naucrary
- Naucratis Painter
- Nauplius
- Nausicaa
- Nausinous
- Nausiphanes
- Nausithous
- Navarch
- Naxia (Caria)
- Naxos (Crete)
- Naxos (mythology)
- Neaera (consort of Helios)
- Neaera (mythology)
- Neaira
- Nealkes
- Neandreia
- Neanthes of Cyzicus
- Neapolis (Chalcidice)
- Neapolis (Thrace)
- Neapolis (Thracian Chersonese)
- Nearchos
- Nearchus of Elea
- Nearchus of Orchomenus
- Nebris
- Neck Amphora by Exekias
- Necklace of Harmonia
- Necromanteion of Acheron
- Neikea
- Nekyia
- Neis
- Neleides
- Neleus
- Neleus of Scepsis
- Nemean Baths
- Nemean Games
- Nemean lion
- Nemesis
- Nemesis (philosophy)
- Neo-Attic
- Neobule
- Neodamodes
- Neon
- Neon (Phocis)
- Neophron
- Neoplatonism
- Neoptolemus
- Neopythagoreanism
- Neorion
- Neorion at Samothrace
- Nepenthe
- Nephalia
- Nephalion
- Nephele
- Nereids
- Nereids (play)
- Nereus
- Nericus
- Neris (Cynuria)
- Nerites
- Neritum
- Nesoi
- Nessos of Chios
- Nessos Painter
- Nessus (centaur)
- Nessus (mythology)
- Nestor
- Nestor's Cup (Mycenae)
- Nestor's Cup (mythology)
- Nestor's Cup (Pithekoussai)
- Nestor of Tarsus
- Nete
- New York Kouros
- Nicaea
- Nicaea (Locris)
- Nicander
- Nicander of Sparta
- Nicanor of Cyrene
- Nicanor Stigmatias
- Nicarchus
- Nicarchus (general)
- Nicarete of Megara
- Nice
- Nichomachus
- Nicias
- Nicias of Nicaea
- Nicippe
- Nicobule
- Nicochares
- Nicocles (Paphos)
- Nicocles (Salamis)
- Nicocles of Sicyon
- Nicodamus (sculptor)
- Nicodorus of Mantineia
- Nicomachus
- Nicomachus (father of Aristotle)
- Nicomachus (son of Aristotle)
- Nicomachus of Thebes
- Nicomedes (mathematician)
- Nicomedes of Sparta
- Nicophon
- Nicopolis
- Nicostratus
- Nicostratus (comic poet)
- Nicoteles of Cyrene
- Nike
- Nike Fixing her Sandal
- Nike of Epidaurus
- Nike of Callimachus
- Nike of Megara
- Nike of Paionios
- Nike of Paros
- Nikosthenes
- Nikosthenic amphora
- Nikoxenos Painter
- Nilus (mythology)
- Nine Lyric Poets
- Ninnion Tablet
- Niobe
- Niobe (Aeschylus play)
- Niobe (Argive)
- Niobe (Sophocles play)
- Niobid Painter
- Niobids
- Nireus
- Nireus (mythology)
- Nisa (Boeotia)
- Nisa (Megaris)
- Nisaea
- Nisos
- Nolan amphora
- Nomia
- Nomos (music)
- Nomos (mythology)
- Nonacris
- Nonnus
- Norakos
- Northampton Group
- Nostoi
- Nostos
- Notion
- Notus
- Noumenia
- Nous
- Nu (letter)
- Nudium
- Numenius of Apamea
- Numenius of Heraclea
- Numisianus
- Nutrition in Classical Antiquity
- Nyctaea
- Nycteïs
- Nycteus
- Nycteus (mythology)
- Nyctimene
- Nyctimus
- Nymph
- Nymphaeum (Olympia)
- Nymphai Hyperboreioi
- Nymphis
- Nymphodorus (physician)
- Nymphodorus of Abdera
- Nympholepsy
- Nysa
- Nysa (Boeotia)
- Nysa (Euboea)
- Nysiads
- Nyx

== O ==
- Oa (Attica)
- Oaxes
- Obelism
- Obol
- Ocalea
- Ocalea (town)
- Oceanids
- Ochimus
- Ochne
- Ocridion
- Octaeteris
- Ocypete
- Ocyrhoe
- Ocyrhoë (Samian nymph)
- Odeon (building)
- Odeon of Agrippa
- Odeon of Athens
- Odeon of Herodes Atticus
- Odyssean gods
- Odysseus
- Odysseus Acanthoplex
- Odysseus in the Underworld krater
- Odyssey
- Oea (Attica)
- Oeae
- Oeagrus
- Oebalus
- Oebotas of Dyme
- Oeceus
- Oechalia (Aetolia)
- Oechalia (Arcadia)
- Oechalia (Euboea)
- Oechalia (Messenia)
- Oechalia (Thessaly)
- Oechalia (Trachis)
- Oechalides
- Oeconomicus
- Oedipodea
- Oedipus
- Oedipus (Euripides)
- Oedipus at Colonus
- Oedipus Rex
- Oeneon
- Oeneus
- Oeniadae
- Oenochoe
- Oenoe
- Oenoe (Attica)
- Oenoe (Corinthia)
- Oenoe (Elis)
- Oenoe (Icaria)
- Oenoe (Marathon)
- Oenomaus
- Oenomaus of Gadara
- Oenone
- Oenopides
- Oenopion
- Oenotropae
- Oenotrus
- Oeonus
- Oestrus (mythology)
- Oesyme
- Oetaea
- Oetaei
- Oetylus
- Oeum
- Oeum (Locris)
- Oeum Cerameicum
- Oeum Deceleicum
- Ogyges
- Ogygia
- Oicles
- Oikeiôsis
- Oikistes
- Oikonomos
- Oikos
- Oileus
- Oinochoe by the Shuvalov Painter
- Oizys
- Olaeis
- Old Comedy
- Old Greek
- Old Man of the Sea
- Old Oenia
- Old Temple of Athena
- Older Parthenon
- Olen
- Olenus
- Olenus (Aetolia)
- Olenus (Achaea)
- Olethros
- Olganos
- Olive branch
- Olive wreath
- Olizon
- Oloosson
- Olophyxus
- Olpae
- Olpae (Locris)
- Oltos
- Olymos
- Olympe
- Olympia, Greece
- Olympia Master
- Olympiad
- Olympias (trireme)
- Olympic Truce
- Olympic winners of the Archaic period
- Olympiodorus the Elder
- Olympiodorus the Younger
- Olympus (musician)
- Olynthiacs
- Olynthus
- Omega
- Omicron
- Omophagia
- Omphale
- Omphalos
- Omphalos of Delphi
- On a Wound by Premeditation
- On Conoids and Spheroids
- On Floating Bodies
- On Horsemanship
- On Ideas
- On Justice
- On Sizes and Distances (Hipparchus)
- On Spirals
- On the Chersonese
- On the Crown
- On the Equilibrium of Planes
- On the False Embassy
- On the Halonnesus
- On the Heavens
- On the Liberty of the Rhodians
- On the Malice of Herodotus
- On the Murder of Eratosthenes
- On the Nature of Man
- On the Navy Boards
- On the Peace
- On the Sacred Disease
- On the Sizes and Distances (Aristarchus)
- On the Sphere and Cylinder
- On Virtue
- Onasander
- Onatas
- Oncae
- Onceium
- Onchestos
- Onchestos (mythology)
- Oncius
- Oneirocritica
- Oneiros
- Onesicritus
- Onesilus
- Onesimos
- Onomacles
- Onomacritus
- Onomarchus
- Onomasti komodein
- Onomastus of Smyrna
- Onthyrius
- Ophelestes
- Opheltes
- Opheltes (mythology)
- Opheltius
- Ophion (god)
- Ophiotaurus
- Ophiussa
- Ophryneion
- Opisthodomos
- Opites
- Opora
- Ops (mythology)
- Opsis
- Opson
- Opsophagos
- Optative
- Opuntian Locris
- Opus (Elis)
- Opus, Greece
- Opus (mythology)
- Orchamus
- Orchomenus
- Orchomenus (Arcadia)
- Orchomenus (Boeotia)
- Orchomenus (Euboea)
- Orchomenus (Thessaly)
- Oread
- Oreithyia Painter
- Oresteia
- Orestes
- Orestes (play)
- Orestes Pursued by the Furies
- Orestheus
- Orestis
- Orgia
- Oribasius
- Oricum
- Orientalizing period
- Orion
- Orithyia
- Orithyia of Athens
- Orithyia (Amazon)
- Ormenium
- Ormenus
- Orneae
- Orneus
- Ornithomancy
- Ornytion
- Ornytus
- Orobiae
- Oropos (Epirus)
- Orpheus
- Orpheus and Eurydice
- Orphic Argonautica
- Orphic Egg
- Orphic Hymns
- Orphism
- Orphne
- Orseis
- Orsilochus
- Orsinome
- Orsippus
- Orthanes
- Orthe (Thessaly)
- Orthostates
- Orthotes
- Orthrus
- Ortygius
- Orus (mythology)
- Orya (play)
- Oschophoria
- Osmida
- Ossa cave
- Ostomachion
- Ostracism
- Otanes
- Othorus
- Othreis
- Othryades
- Othryoneus
- Otrera
- Otryne
- Otus of Cyllene
- Ourea
- Ousia
- Outis
- Overline
- Owl of Athena
- Oxford Palmette Class
- Oxyathres of Heraclea
- Oxybeles
- Oxygala
- Oxylus
- Oxylus (son of Haemon)
- Oxyntes
- Oxythemis of Coroneia
- Ozolian Locris

== P ==
- Paean
- Paean (god)
- Paeania
- Paeon
- Paeon (father of Agastrophus)
- Paeon (son of Antilochus)
- Paeon (son of Poseidon)
- Paeon of Elis
- Paeonidae
- Paestan vase painting
- Paestum
- Pagae
- Pagondas
- Paideia
- Painter of Acropolis 606
- Painter of Berlin A 34
- Painter of Berlin 1686
- Painter of Munich 1410
- Painter of Nicosia Olpe
- Painter of Palermo 489
- Painter of the Berlin Dancing Girl
- Painter of the Dresden Lekanis
- Painter of the Vatican Mourner
- Pair of athletes (Delphi)
- Paired opposites
- Palace of Nestor
- Palaechthon
- Palaestinus
- Palaestra
- Palaestra at Delphi
- Palaestra at Olympia
- Palaestra (mythology)
- Palaikastro Kouros
- Palamedes
- Palici
- Palioxis
- Palladium
- Pallake
- Pallantides
- Pallas (daughter of Triton)
- Pallas (Giant)
- Pallas (mythology)
- Pallas (son of Evander)
- Pallas (son of Lycaon)
- Pallas (son of Pandion)
- Pallas (Titan)
- Pallene (Attica)
- Pallene (daughter of Sithon)
- Pamboeotia
- Pambotadae
- Pammenes of Thebes
- Pammon
- Pamphaios
- Pamphilus
- Pamphylian Greek
- Pamphylus
- Pan
- Pan Painter
- Panacea
- Panaenus
- Panaetius
- Panares
- Panathenaic amphora
- Panathenaic Games
- Panathenaic Stadium
- Panchaia (island)
- Pancrates of Athens
- Pandaie
- Pandareus
- Pandarus
- Pandia
- Pandia (festival)
- Pandion (hero)
- Pandion (mythology)
- Pandion I
- Pandion II
- Pandionis
- Pandora
- Pandora's box
- Pandora of Thessaly
- Pandorus
- Pandosia (Epirus)
- Pandroseion
- Pandrosus
- Pandura
- Panegyris
- Panhellenic Games
- Panhellenion
- Panionium
- Pankration
- Panopeus
- Panopeus (mythology)
- Panoply
- Panormus
- Panther Painter
- Panthoides
- Panthous
- Pantites
- Pantodapoi
- Panyassis
- Paphos
- Pappus of Alexandria
- Papyrus Oxyrhynchus 221
- Papyrus Oxyrhynchus 223
- Papyrus Oxyrhynchus 224
- Papyrus Oxyrhynchus 225
- Papyrus Oxyrhynchus 226
- Papyrus Oxyrhynchus 413
- Parabasis
- Paradox of the Court
- Paraebius
- Paragraphos
- Paralia (Attica)
- Parallel Lives
- Paralus (ship)
- Paralus and Xanthippus
- Parauaea
- Parergon
- Parian Chronicle
- Parian marble
- Paris
- Parmenides
- Parmenides (dialogue)
- Parmeniskos group
- Paroikoi
- Paros
- Parrhasius (painter)
- Parrhasius (son of Lycaon)
- Partheniae
- Parthenius of Nicaea
- Parthenon
- Parthenon Frieze
- Parthenopeus
- Participle
- Pasicles of Thebes
- Pasion
- Pasiphaë
- Pasithea
- Passaron
- Patera
- Patreus
- Patro the Epicurean
- Patrocles (geographer)
- Patroclus
- Patroclus (admiral)
- Pausanias (geographer)
- Pausanias of Athens
- Pausanias of Sicily
- Pausanias of Sparta
- Pausanias the Regent
- Pausanias' description of Delphi
- Pausias
- Peace (play)
- Peace of Antalcidas
- Peace of Callias
- Peace of Nicias
- Peace of Philocrates
- Peak sanctuaries
- Pedanius Dioscorides
- Pedasus
- Pederasty in ancient Greece
- Pedestal of Agrippa
- Pediments of the Parthenon
- Pegaeae
- Pegasides
- Pegasus
- Peiraikos
- Peirasia
- Peirous
- Peisander
- Peisander (navarch)
- Peisander (oligarch)
- Peisenor
- Peisistratus of Orchomenus
- Peisistratus of Pylos
- Peitharchia
- Peitho
- Pelagon
- Pelanor
- Pelasgia
- Pelasgians
- Pelasgic wall
- Pelasgiotis
- Pelasgus
- Pelasgus of Argos
- Peleces
- Peleiades
- Peleus
- Pelia
- Peliades
- Pelias
- Peliganes
- Pelike
- Pelike with actors preparing
- Pelinna
- Pella
- Pella curse tablet
- Pellana
- Pellene
- Pelopia
- Pelopia (daughter of Thyestes)
- Pelopidas
- Pelopion
- Peloponnese
- Peloponnesian League
- Peloponnesian War
- Pelops
- Pelops (mythology)
- Pelops (son of Agamemnon)
- Pelops of Sparta
- Peltast
- Peneleos
- Penelope
- Penestai
- Peneus
- Pentathlon
- Pentecontaetia
- Penteconter
- Pentele
- Penthesilea
- Penthesilea Painter
- Pentheus
- Penthilus of Mycenae
- Penthus
- Peplos
- Peplos Kore
- Pepromene
- Peraea (Euboea)
- Perdix (mythology)
- Peregrinus Proteus
- Pergamon
- Pergamon Altar
- Pergase
- Periander
- Periboea (daughter of Alcathous)
- Peribolos
- Pericles
- Pericles the Younger
- Pericles with the Corinthian helmet
- Periclymenus
- Periclytus
- Perictione
- Perieres
- Perieres of Messenia
- Perikeiromene
- Perileos
- Perimede
- Perimedes
- Perioeci
- Peripatetic school
- Peripatos (Akropolis)
- Peripeteia
- Periphas
- Periphas (king of Attica)
- Periphetes
- Periphetes (son of Hephaestus)
- Peripteros
- Perispomenon
- Peristasis
- Peristera
- Peristhenes
- Perithoedae
- Peritrope
- Perizoma Group
- Peronai
- Perrhaebi
- Perrhaebia
- Perrhidae
- Persaeus
- Perse
- Perseids (mythology)
- Persephone
- Persephone Painter
- Perserschutt
- Perses (brother of Hesiod)
- Perses (mythology)
- Perses of Colchis
- Perses (son of Perseus)
- Perses (Titan)
- Perseus
- Perseus (geometer)
- Perseus of Pylos
- Persian Rider
- Persica (Ctesias)
- Petalism
- Petasos
- Peteon
- Petraeus (mythology)
- Pezhetairos
- Phaedimus (mythology)
- Phaeax (architect)
- Phaeax (orator)
- Phaedo
- Phaedo of Elis
- Phaedra (mythology)
- Phaedra (Sophocles play)
- Phaedra complex
- Phaedrus (Athenian)
- Phaedrus the Epicurean
- Phaenarete
- Phaenias of Eresus
- Phaenon
- Phaenops
- Phaethon
- Phaethon of Syria
- Phaethon (play)
- Phaethusa
- Phaistos Disc
- Phalaikos
- Phalanthus of Tarentum
- Phalanx (mythology)
- Phalerum
- Phalerus
- Phanas of Pellene
- Phanes
- Phanes (coin issuer)
- Phanias (Athenian commander)
- Phantasiai
- Phantes
- Phanto of Phlius
- Phanus (mythology)
- Phaon
- Phara
- Pharae (Boeotia)
- Pharae (Crete)
- Pharis
- Pharmakos
- Phasis (mythology)
- Phasis (town)
- Phayllos of Croton
- Phegaea (Aigeis)
- Phegaea (Pandionis)
- Phegeus
- Phegeus of Psophis
- Phegus
- Pheidippides
- Pheidon
- Pheidon I
- Phelloe
- Pheme
- Phemius
- Phene
- Phereclus
- Pherecrates
- Pherecydes of Athens
- Pherecydes of Leros
- Pherecydes of Syros
- Pheres
- Pherusa
- Phi
- Phiale of Megara
- Phiale Painter
- Phialo
- Phidias
- Phidippus
- Phigalia
- Philaemon
- Philaenis
- Philaeus
- Philagrius of Epirus
- Philaidae
- Philammon
- Philander (mythology)
- Philemon (poet)
- Philia
- Philia (Greco-Roman magic)
- Philinus of Athens
- Philinus of Cos
- Philip II of Macedon
- Philip of Opus
- Philippeioi
- Philippeion
- Philippi
- Philippic
- Philippides (comic poet)
- Philippus of Chollidae
- Philippus of Croton
- Philiscus of Aegina
- Philiscus of Corcyra
- Philistus
- Philo of Byzantium
- Philo of Larissa
- Philo the Dialectician
- Philochorus
- Philocles
- Philoctetes
- Philoctetes (Euripides play)
- Philoctetes (Sophocles play)
- Philodemus (mythology)
- Philodice
- Philoetius (Odyssey)
- Philoi
- Philolaus
- Philomelus
- Philon
- Philonides of Laodicea
- Philonoe
- Philonome (daughter of Tragasus)
- Philophrosyne
- Philopoemen
- Philosopher king
- Philostratus
- Philostratus of Lemnos
- Philostratus the Younger
- Philotas (Antiochid general)
- Philotas (musician)
- Philotes
- Philotimo
- Philoxenus (physician)
- Philoxenus of Cythera
- Philoxenus of Eretria
- Philyllius
- Philyra (mythology)
- Philyra (Oceanid)
- Phineus
- Phintias
- Phintys
- Phlegethon
- Phlegra
- Phlegyas
- Phlias
- Phlius
- Phlya
- Phlyax play
- Phobetor
- Phobos
- Phocais
- Phocion
- Phocis
- Phocus
- Phocus of Aegina
- Phocus of Boeotia
- Phocus of Corinth
- Phoebe (mythology)
- Phoebe (daughter of Leucippus)
- Phoebe (Titaness)
- Phoebidas
- Phoenix (son of Agenor)
- Phoenix (son of Amyntor)
- Pholoe Painter
- Pholus (mythology)
- Phonoi
- Phora
- Phorbas
- Phorbas (king of Argos)
- Phorbas of Elis
- Phorbas of Thessaly
- Phorbus (mythology)
- Phorcys
- Phorcys of Phrygia
- Phorminx
- Phormio
- Phoroneus
- Phoronis (Hellanicus)
- Phoros
- Phradmon
- Phrasikleia Kore
- Phrasimus
- Phrasius
- Phratry
- Phrearrhii
- Phrenius
- Phrike
- Phrixus
- Phronesis
- Phrontis
- Phrontis (son of Phrixus)
- Phrourarch
- Phryctoria
- Phrygian helmet
- Phrygians (play)
- Phrygillus
- Phrygius
- Phryne
- Phrynichus (comic poet)
- Phrynichus (oligarch)
- Phrynichus (tragic poet)
- Phrynon
- Phrynos
- Phrynos Painter
- Phthia
- Phthia (mistress of Amyntor)
- Phthia (mythology)
- Phthonus
- Phye
- Phylace (Thessaly)
- Phylacides
- Phylacus
- Phylarch
- Phylas
- Phyle
- Phyle (Attica)
- Phyle Campaign
- Phyle Cave
- Phyleus
- Phyllis (river god)
- Phylo (Odyssey)
- Phylonomus
- Physcoa
- Physcus
- Physis
- Phytalus
- Pi (letter)
- Picolous
- Pieria (Greek myth)
- Pieria (mythology)
- Pierian Spring
- Pierus of Emathia
- Pileus (hat)
- Pimpleia
- Pinakion
- Pinax
- Pindar
- Pindar's First Olympian Ode
- Pindus
- Pioneer Group
- Piraeus
- Piraeus Apollo
- Piraeus Artemis
- Piraeus Athena
- Piraeus Painter
- Pirene (fountain)
- Pirene (mythology)
- Pirithous
- Pisa
- Pisidice
- Pisidice of Methymna
- Pisistratus
- Pisticci Painter
- Pistis
- Pistoxenos Painter
- Pitane (Laconia)
- Pithos
- Pithus
- Pitsa panels
- Pittacus of Mytilene
- Pittheus
- Pitys (mythology)
- Placenta cake
- Plague of Athens
- Planetae
- Plataea
- Platanus
- Plato
- Plato (comic poet)
- Plato's five regimes
- Plato's number
- Plato's political philosophy
- Plato's theory of soul
- Plato's unwritten doctrines
- Platonic Academy
- Platonic epistemology
- Platonic idealism
- Platonic realism
- Platonism
- Pleiades
- Pleione
- Pleistarchus
- Pleisthenes
- Pleistoanax
- Plethron
- Pleuron
- Pleuron of Aetolia
- Plexippus
- Plotheia
- Plotinus
- Plouto (Oceanid)
- Ploutonion
- Ploutonion at Hierapolis
- Pluralist school
- Plutarch
- Pluto
- Plutus
- Plutus (play)
- Plynteria
- Pneuma
- Pneuma (Stoic)
- Pneumatic school
- Pnyx
- Podalirius
- Podarces
- Podes
- Poeas
- Poena
- Poiesis
- Polemarch
- Polemarchus
- Polemic
- Polemocrates (physician)
- Polemon
- Polemon of Athens
- Polemos
- Poliporthes
- Polis
- Politarch
- Politeia
- Polites (friend of Odysseus)
- Polites of Troy
- Politics (Aristotle)
- Polium
- Polos
- Polos Painter
- Polus
- Polyaenus of Lampsacus
- Polyandrion
- Polybius
- Polybolos
- Polybotes
- Polybus (physician)
- Polybus of Corinth
- Polybus of Sicyon
- Polybus (son of Antenor)
- Polycaon
- Polychares of Messenia
- Polycles (155 BC)
- Polycles (370 BCE)
- Polycrates
- Polyctor
- Polydamas
- Polydamas of Pharsalus
- Polydamas of Skotoussa
- Polydamna
- Polydectes
- Polydectes of Sparta
- Polydorus
- Polydorus of Sparta
- Polydorus of Thebes
- Polydorus of Troy
- Polydorus (son of Astyanax)
- Polygnotos (vase painter)
- Polygnotus
- Polyhymnia
- Polyidus
- Polyidus (poet)
- Polyidus of Corinth
- Polyidus of Thessaly
- Polymatheia
- Polymedes of Argos
- Polymedon
- Polymele
- Polymele (daughter of Aeolus)
- Polymestor
- Polymnestus
- Polypheides
- Polyphemos Painter
- Polyphemos reclining and holding a drinking bowl
- Polyphemus
- Polyphemus (Argonaut)
- Polyphrasmon
- Polypoetes
- Polystratus
- Polystratus the Epicurean
- Polytechnus
- Polyxena
- Polyxenidas
- Polyxenus
- Polyxo
- Polyxo (Rhodes)
- Pompilus
- Ponos
- Pontic Group
- Pontus
- Poppy goddess
- Porphyrion
- Porthaon
- Portico of the Aetolians
- Porus (Attica)
- Porus (mythology)
- Poseidon
- Poseidon of Melos
- Posidippus (comic poet)
- Posidippus (epigrammatic poet)
- Posidonius
- Potamides
- Potamo of Mytilene
- Potamon
- Potamus (Attica)
- Potamus Deiradiotes
- Potnia
- Potnia Theron
- Potone
- Pottery of ancient Greece
- Pous
- Prasiae
- Pratinas
- Praxagoras
- Praxagoras of Athens
- Praxias and Androsthenes
- Praxidice
- Praxiphanes
- Praxiteles
- Praxithea
- Pre-Greek substrate
- Pre-Socratic philosophy
- Precepts of Chiron
- Priam
- Priam Painter
- Priapus
- Priasus
- Priene
- Priene Inscription
- Priestess of Hera at Argos
- Prince of the Lilies
- Princeton Painter
- Probalinthus
- Probolê
- Proboulos
- Procles
- Proclus
- Procne
- Procne and Itys (sculpture)
- Procris
- Prodicus
- Prodromoi
- Proetids
- Proetus
- Proetus (son of Abas)
- Prohairesis
- Proioxis
- Prokles (Pergamon)
- Promachos
- Promachus
- Promachus of Macedon
- Promachus of Pellene
- Promanteia
- Promedon
- Prometheia
- Prometheus
- Prometheus Bound
- Prometheus the Fire-Bringer
- Prometheus Unbound (Aeschylus)
- Pronax
- Pronous
- Pronunciation of Ancient Greek in teaching
- Prophasis
- Propylaea
- Propylaea (Acropolis of Athens)
- Prorrhesis
- Prosodion
- Prosody (Greek)
- Prospalta (Attica)
- Prostitution in ancient Greece
- Prostyle
- Prosymna
- Prosymnus
- Protagonist
- Protagoras
- Protagoras (dialogue)
- Protesilaus
- Proteus
- Proteus (mythology)
- Prothoenor
- Prothous
- Prothyraia
- Protogeneia
- Protogenes
- Protogeometric style
- Protomachus (Athenian general)
- Protostates
- Providence Painter
- Proxenus of Atarneus
- Proxenus of Boeotia
- Proxeny
- Prytaneion
- Prytanis (king of Sparta)
- Psalacantha
- Psamathe (Nereid)
- Psaphis
- Pseras
- Pseudanor
- Pseudo-Chalkidian vase painting
- Pseudo-Demosthenes
- Pseudo-Scymnus
- Pseudodipteral
- Pseudoperipteros
- Psi
- Psi and phi type figurine
- Psiax
- Psiloi
- Psilosis
- Psophis
- Psophis (mythology)
- Psychagogy
- Psyche
- Psychro Cave
- Psykter
- Ptelea (Attica)
- Pterelaus
- Pterelaus (son of Lelex)
- Pterelaus (son of Taphius)
- Pteruges
- Ptolemais of Cyrene
- Ptolemy (somatophylax)
- Ptolemy of Epirus
- Ptolemy of Thebes
- Ptolichus
- Ptoon Painter
- Pyanopsia
- Pygmalion
- Pyknon
- Pylades
- Pylaemenes
- Pylaeus
- Pylaon
- Pylene
- Pylos Combat Agate
- Pylus
- Pyracmus of Euboea
- Pyraechmes
- Pyramus and Thisbe
- Pyrausta
- Pyrene
- Pyre of Heracles
- Pyrgoteles
- Pyrilampes
- Pyroeis
- Pyrrha of Thessaly
- Pyrrhic War
- Pyrrhichios
- Pyrrhichos
- Pyrrho
- Pyrrhonism
- Pyrrhus of Epirus
- Pyrrhus' invasion of the Peloponnese
- Pyrrhus (mythology)
- Pyrrhus of Athens
- Pythagoras
- Pythagoras (boxer)
- Pythagoras (sculptor)
- Pythagoras of Laconia
- Pythagoras the Spartan
- Pythagorean astronomical system
- Pythagorean interval
- Pythagorean tuning
- Pythagoreanism
- Pythagoreion
- Pytheas
- Pythia
- Pythian Games
- Pythias
- Pythion
- Pythion of Megara
- Pythius of Priene
- Python (mythology)
- Python (painter)
- Python of Aenus
- Pytia
- Pyxis (vessel)

== Q ==
- Quadratrix of Hippias
- Quantitative metathesis
- Quintus Smyrnaeus

== R ==
- Rampin Rider
- Rape in Greek mythology
- Rape of Persephone
- Rarian Field
- Rarus
- Rational animal
- Red Figure Pelike with an Actor Dressed as a Bird
- Red-figure pottery
- Reed Painter
- Regina Vasorum
- Regions of ancient Greece
- Representation of women in Athenian tragedy
- Republic (Plato)
- Republic (Zeno)
- Resting Satyr
- Returns from Troy
- Revelers Vase
- Rhacius
- Rhadamanthus
- Rhadine and Leontichus
- Rhamnus (Crete)
- Rhaphanidosis
- Rhapso
- Rhapsode
- Rhaucus
- Rhea
- Rhebas (river)
- Rhene
- Rhesus (play)
- Rhesus of Thrace
- Rhetoric (Aristotle)
- Rhexenor
- Rhianus
- Rhieia
- Rhipe
- Rhittenia
- Rhium (Messenia)
- Rho
- Rhodian vase painting
- Rhodius
- Rhodope (mythology)
- Rhodope (queen)
- Rhodopis and Euthynicus
- Rhodos
- Rhoecus
- Rhoecus (mythology)
- Rhoecus of Cnidus
- Rhoeo
- Rhoiteion
- Rhombus formation
- Rhomos
- Rhoptron
- Rhynchus (Greece)
- Rhytium
- Rhyton
- Riace bronzes
- Rider Amphora
- Rider Painter
- Ring of Gyges
- Ripheus
- Rival Lovers
- River gods
- Rod of Asclepius
- Roman–Greek wars
- Romanization of Greek
- Rough breathing
- Royal formula of Parthian coinage
- Rufus of Ephesus
- Running in Ancient Greece
- Rycroft Painter

== S ==
- Sabouroff head
- Sacred Band of Thebes
- Sacred caves of Crete
- Sacred Gate
- Sacred Way
- Sacrificial tripod
- Sacrificial victims of Minotaur
- Sage
- Salamis
- Salamis Stone
- Salamis Tablet
- Salinon
- Salmacis
- Salmacis (fountain)
- Salmoneus
- Salpe
- Salpinx
- Same (Homer)
- Sami
- Samia (play)
- Samian Sibyl
- Samian vase painting
- Samian War
- Samothrace temple complex
- Sampi
- San (letter)
- Sanctuary of Aphrodite Aphrodisias
- Sanctuary of Aphrodite Paphia
- Sanctuary of Apollo Maleatas
- Sanctuary of Artemis Orthia
- Sanctuary of Pandion
- Sanctuary of the Mother of Gods and Aphrodite
- Sanctuary of Zeus Polieus
- Sangarius
- Sannyrion
- Saon
- Sapphic stanza
- Sappho
- Sappho Painter
- Sarissa
- Sarissophoroi
- Saon (mythology)
- Saron (mythology)
- Sarpedon
- Sarpedon (Trojan War hero)
- Satyr
- Satyr play
- Satyros
- Satyrus the Peripatetic
- Scamander
- Scamander of Boeotia
- Scamandrius
- Scamandrius (Trojan war)
- Scambonidae
- Scaphe
- Scaphism
- Schedius
- Scheria
- Schoeneus
- Schoenus (Boeotia)
- Scholarch
- School of Abdera
- Science in classical antiquity
- Sciritae
- Sciritis
- Sciron
- Scirtonium
- Scirtus (mythology)
- Scirum
- Scirus (Arcadia)
- Scolus (Boeotia)
- Scopas
- Sculpture of a horse (Olympia B 1741)
- Scylla
- Scylla (daughter of Nisus)
- Scylla (mythology)
- Scymnus of Chios
- Scytale
- Scythian archers
- Second Alcibiades
- Second Ancient Theatre, Larissa
- Second Athenian League
- Second Battle of Lamia
- Second declension
- Second Macedonian War
- Second Messenian War
- Second Persian invasion of Greece
- Second Philippic
- Second Sacred War
- Second Temple of Hera (Paestum)
- Second War of the Diadochi
- Seikilos epitaph
- Seisachtheia
- Selemnus
- Selene
- Seleucus of Alexandria
- Seleucus of Seleucia
- Sellasia (Laconia)
- Selloi
- Semachidae
- Semachos
- Semele
- Semele (play)
- Semonides of Amorgos
- Semystra
- Senex amans
- Serapion of Alexandria
- Serenus of Antinoöpolis
- Sestos
- Seven against Thebes
- Seven Against Thebes
- Seven Sages of Greece
- Severe style
- Shambling Bull Painter
- Shield bearer
- Shield of Achilles
- Shield of Heracles
- Ship of State
- Shirt of Nessus
- Shuvalov Painter
- Siana cup
- Sibyl
- Sibyl rock
- Sibyna
- Sibyrtius
- Sicilian Expedition
- Sicilian vase painting
- Sicilian Wars
- Sicinnus
- Sicyon
- Sicyon (mythology)
- Sicyonian Treasury
- Side (daughter of Ictinus)
- Side (mythology)
- Side (wife of Orion)
- Siege of Athens (287 BC)
- Siege of Athens and Piraeus (87–86 BC)
- Siege of Eretria
- Siege of Gythium
- Siege of Lamia
- Siege of Lilybaeum (278 BC)
- Siege of Mantinea
- Siege of Medion
- Siege of Megalopolis
- Siege of Naxos (499 BC)
- Siege of Perinthus
- Siege of Plataea
- Siege of Rhodes (305–304 BC)
- Siege of Sparta
- Siege of Syracuse (213–212 BC)
- Siege of Syracuse (278 BC)
- Siege of Syracuse (311–309 BC)
- Siege of Syracuse (343 BC)
- Siege of Syracuse (397 BC)
- Siege of Thebes (292–291 BC)
- Siege of Tyre (332 BC)
- Sigma
- Sikyonioi
- Silanion
- Silanus of Ambracia
- Silenus
- Sileraioi
- Silloi
- Silver age
- Silver stater with a turtle
- Sima
- Simmias (explorer)
- Simmias of Rhodes
- Simmias of Syracuse
- Simmias of Thebes
- Simon of Athens
- Simon the Shoemaker
- Simonides of Ceos
- Sinis
- Sinoessa
- Sinon
- Sinope
- Sintice
- Siphnian Treasury
- Siproites
- Siren
- Siren Painter
- Sirius
- Sirras
- Sisyphus
- Sisyphus (dialogue)
- Sisyphus Painter
- Sithon
- Six's technique
- Skene
- Skeptouchos
- Skeuophoros
- Skira
- Skolion
- Skyphos
- Skyros
- Skythes
- Slavery in ancient Greece
- Smicrus (mythology)
- Smikros
- Smilax
- Smilis
- Smooth breathing
- Smyrna
- Smyrna (mythology)
- Snub-nose painter
- Social War (220–217 BC)
- Social War (357–355 BC)
- Sock and buskin
- Socrates
- Socrates of Achaea
- Socrates the Younger
- Socratic dialogue
- Socratic method
- Socratic problem
- Socratic questioning
- Socus
- Sokles
- Sollium
- Solois
- Solon
- Solonian Constitution
- Solymus
- Somatophylakes
- Sons of Aegyptus
- Soos (king of Sparta)
- Sopater of Paphos
- Sopater (mythology)
- Sophilos
- Sophist
- Sophist (dialogue)
- Sophistic works of Antiphon
- Sophocles
- Sophron
- Sophroniscus
- Sophrosyne
- Sopolis of Macedon
- Soranus of Ephesus
- Sosicrates
- Sosigenes (Stoic)
- Sosigenes of Alexandria
- Sosigenes the Peripatetic
- Sosipolis (god)
- Sositheus
- Sostratos of Aegina
- Sostratos of Chios
- Sostratus of Dyme
- Sostratus of Pellene
- Sostratus of Sicyon
- Sosus of Pergamon
- Sotades
- Sotades of Crete
- Sotades Painter
- Soter
- Soter (daimon)
- Soteria (festival)
- Soteria
- Soteridas of Epidaurus
- Sotion
- Sotira (physician)
- Sounion
- Sounion Kouros
- Sousta
- South Italian ancient Greek pottery
- South Stoa I (Athens)
- Sparta
- Sparta (mythology)
- Spartan army
- Spartan Constitution
- Spartan hegemony
- Spartan naval art: Ivory plaque
- Spartia temple
- Spartiate
- Spartocid dynasty
- Spartoi
- Spercheides
- Speusippus
- Sphaeria
- Sphaerus
- Sphendale
- Spherical Earth
- Sphettus
- Sphodrias
- Sphyrelaton
- Spintharus of Corinth
- Spool-shaped pyxis (NAMA 5225)
- Sport in ancient Greek art
- Sporus of Nicaea
- Spoudaiogeloion
- Spurious diphthong
- Stadion (unit)
- Stadion (running race)
- Stadium at Nemea
- Stadium at Olympia
- Stadium of Delphi
- Stag Hunt Mosaic
- Stagira (ancient city)
- Stamnos
- Standing Youth (Munich SL 162)
- Staphylus
- Staphylus (goatherd)
- Staphylus (son of Dionysus)
- Staphylus of Naucratis
- Stasander
- Stasanor
- Stasimon
- Stasinus
- Stasis
- Stater
- Statue of the priestess Aristonoe
- Statue of Zeus at Olympia
- Statuette of hoplite (Berlin Antiquities Collection Misc. 7470)
- Steiria
- Stele of Aristion
- Stele of Arniadas
- Stentor
- Stephane
- Sterope
- Sterope (Pleiad)
- Sterope of Tegea
- Stesichorus
- Stesicles
- Stesimbrotos of Thasos
- Stheneboea
- Stheneboea (play)
- Sthenelaidas
- Sthenele
- Sthenelus
- Sthenelus (son of Capaneus)
- Sthenelus of Mycenae
- Sthennis
- Stheno
- Stichius (mythology)
- Stichomythia
- Stilbe
- Stilbon
- Stilpo
- Stirrup jar
- Stoa
- Stoa Basileios
- Stoa of Attalos
- Stoa of Eumenes
- Stoibadeion
- Stoic categories
- Stoic logic
- Stoic passions
- Stoic physics
- Stoichedon
- Stoicism
- Strabo
- Strangford Apollo
- Strategos
- Stratichus
- Straticles
- Strato of Lampsacus
- Stratobates
- Stratocles
- Stratonice
- Stratonice of Pontus
- Stratonicus of Athens
- Strattis
- Strattis of Chios
- Strombichides
- Strongylion
- Strophe
- Strophius
- Strymon
- Studies on Homer and the Homeric Age
- Stygne
- Stylobate
- Stymphalian birds
- Stymphalus
- Stymphalus (Arcadia)
- Stymphalus (son of Elatus)
- Styra
- Styx
- Subjunctive
- Sublunary sphere
- Substantial form
- Successions of Philosophers
- Sufax
- Suicide of Ajax Vase
- Suitors of Helen
- Suitors of Penelope
- Sukhumi stela
- Superposed order
- Susarion
- Swallow song of Rhodes
- Swing Painter
- Syagrus (poet)
- Sybaris (mythology)
- Sybridae
- Syceus
- Sycophancy
- Syennesis of Cyprus
- Syleus (mythology)
- Syloson (son of Calliteles)
- Syme (mythology)
- Symmoria
- Symplegades
- Sympoliteia
- Symposium
- Symposium (Xenophon)
- Synedrion
- Synizesis
- Synoecism
- Synoikia
- Syntagmatarchis
- Sypalettus
- Syrinx
- Syrtos
- Syssitia

== T ==
- Taenarus
- Tagmatarchis
- Tagus
- Tainia
- Talares
- Talaria
- Talaus
- Taleides Painter
- Talos
- Talos (inventor)
- Talthybius
- Tanagra figurine
- Tanais Tablets
- Tantalus
- Tantalus (mythology)
- Tantalus (son of Broteas)
- Tantalus (son of Menelaus)
- Taphians
- Taphius
- Taras
- Taraxippus
- Targitaos
- Tarporley Painter
- Tarquinia Painter
- Tarrha
- Tartarus
- Tau
- Taurus
- Taxiarch
- Taxiles (Pontic army officer)
- Taygete
- Techne
- Tecmessa
- Tecmessa of Phrygia
- Tectamus
- Tegea
- Tegea (Crete)
- Tegeates
- Tegyra
- Tegyrios
- Teichoscopy
- Teithras
- Talaemenes
- Telauges
- Telchines
- Teleboans
- Telecleia
- Telecleides
- Telecles
- Teleclus
- Teledice
- Telegonus (son of Odysseus)
- Telegony
- Telemachus
- Telemachy
- Telemus
- Teleon
- Telephassa
- Telephus
- Telepylos
- Teles of Megara
- Telesarchus (military commander)
- Telesarchus of Samos
- Telesilla
- Telesphorus (mythology)
- Telestas
- Telesterion
- Telesto
- Telete
- Teleutias
- Tellis of Sicyon
- Tellus of Athens
- Telmius
- Telos
- Telycrates
- Temenos
- Temenus
- Temenus (mythology)
- Temple C (Selinus)
- Temple E (Selinus)
- Temple F (Selinus)
- Temple of Aphaea
- Temple of Aphrodite at Acrocorinth
- Temple of Aphrodite, Knidos
- Temple of Aphrodite, Kythira
- Temple of Aphrodite, Sparta
- Temple of Aphrodite Urania
- Temple of Apollo (Delphi)
- Temple of Apollo (Syracuse)
- Temple of Apollo Patroos
- Temple of Artemis
- Temple of Artemis, Corfu
- Temple of Artemis Amarynthia
- Temple of Artemis Ephesia
- Temple of Asclepius, Epidaurus
- Temple of Athena (Paestum)
- Temple of Athena (Syracuse)
- Temple of Athena Alea
- Temple of Athena Lindia
- Temple of Athena Nike
- Temple of Athena Polias (Priene)
- Temple of Concordia, Agrigento
- Temple of Demeter Amphictyonis
- Temple of Dionysus, Naxos
- Temple of Dionysus Lysios
- Temple of Hephaestus
- Temple of Hera Lacinia
- Temple of Hera, Mon Repos
- Temple of Hera, Olympia
- Temple of Hera Lacinia
- Temple of Heracles, Agrigento
- Temple of Isthmia
- Temple of Olympian Zeus, Agrigento
- Temple of Olympian Zeus, Athens
- Temple of Poseidon, Sounion
- Temple of Poseidon (Tainaron)
- Temple of Poseidon (Taranto)
- Temple of Sangri
- Temple of the Delians
- Temple of Zeus, Olympia
- Temple of Zeus Kyrios
- Ten Thousand
- Tenages
- Tenerus (son of Apollo)
- Tenes
- Tereus
- Tereus (play)
- Term logic
- Termerus
- Terpander
- Terpsichore
- Terpsichore statuette from Dodona
- Terpsimbrotos
- Terpsion
- Tetartemorion
- Tethys
- Tetradrachm
- Tetrapharmacum
- Tetrapharmakos
- Tetrapolis (Attica)
- Teucer
- Teumessian fox
- Teutamides
- Teuthis
- Teuthis (mythology)
- Teuthras
- Teuthras (mythology)
- Thalassa
- Thalatta! Thalatta!
- Thales (painter)
- Thales of Miletus
- Thales's theorem
- Thaletas
- Thalia (Grace)
- Thalia (Muse)
- Thalia (Nereid)
- Thalia (nymph)
- Thalpius (mythology)
- Thalysia
- Thamyris
- Thanatos
- Thanatos Painter
- Thargelia
- Thasian rebellion
- Thasus
- Thaumacus (mythology)
- Thaumas
- The Affecter
- Theaetetus (dialogue)
- Theaetetus (mathematician)
- Theagenes of Megara
- Theagenes of Patras
- Theagenes of Rhegium
- Theagenes of Thasos
- Theages
- Theandrios
- Theano
- Theano of Troy
- Theano (philosopher)
- Theano (wife of Metapontus)
- Thearides
- Theatre of ancient Greece
- Theatre of Dionysus
- Thebaid
- Theban Cycle
- Theban hegemony
- Theban kings in Greek mythology
- Theban–Spartan War
- Theban Treasury (Delphi)
- Thebe
- Thebes
- Thebes tablets
- Theia
- Theia (Oceanid)
- Theias
- Theiodamas
- Theios aner
- Thelxinoë
- Thelxion
- Thelxion of Argos
- Thelxion of Sicyon
- Themacus
- Themis
- Themis of Rhamnous
- Themiscyra
- Themison of Eretria
- Themison of Laodicea
- Themison of Samos
- Themison of Thera
- Themista of Lampsacus
- Themiste
- Themisto
- Themistoclean Wall
- Themistocles
- Theobule
- Theoclymenus
- Theoclymenus (mythology)
- Theodas of Laodicea
- Theodectes
- Theodorus of Cyrene
- Theodorus of Samos
- Theodorus the Atheist
- Theodosius of Alexandria (grammarian)
- Theodosius of Bithynia
- Theodosius' Spherics
- Theogenes
- Theognis
- Theognis of Megara
- Theogony
- Theomachy
- Theombrotus
- Theon of Alexandria
- Theon of Samos
- Theon of Smyrna
- Theophane
- Theophiliscus
- Theophilus (geographer)
- Theophrastus
- Theopompus
- Theopompus (comic poet)
- Theopompus of Sparta
- Theorica
- Theoris of Lemnos
- Theorodokoi
- Theoroi
- Theory of forms
- Theramenes
- Therapeutae of Asclepius
- Therapne
- Theras
- Theriac
- Theriaca
- Theristai
- Therma
- Thermopylae
- Thermos
- Thero
- Theron of Acragas
- Thersander
- Thersander (Epigoni)
- Thersanon
- Thersilochus
- Thersites
- Theseia
- Theseus
- Theseus Painter
- Theseus Ring
- Thesmophoria
- Thesmophoriazusae
- Thespia
- Thespiae
- Thespis
- Thespius
- Thesprotia (polis)
- Thesprotians
- Thessalian League
- Thessalian vase painting
- Thessaliotis
- Thessalus
- Thessalus
- Thestius
- Thestor (mythology)
- Theta
- Thetidium
- Thetis
- Theudius
- Thiasus
- Thimbron (fl. 400–391 BC)
- Third Macedonian War
- Third man argument
- Third Philippic
- Third Sacred War
- Thyreus (mythology)
- Thirty Tyrants
- Thirty Years' Peace
- Thisbe (Boeotia)
- Thoas
- Thoas (king of Aetolia)
- Thoas (king of Corinth)
- Thoas (king of Lemnos)
- Thoas (king of the Taurians)
- Thoas (son of Jason)
- Tholos
- Tholos of Delphi
- Thoön (mythology)
- Thootes
- Thorae
- Thorakitai
- Thorax (Aetolia)
- Thorax of Lacedaemonia
- Thorax of Larissa
- Thoricus
- Thrace (mythology)
- Thrasippus
- Thrasos
- Thrassa
- Thrasybulus
- Thrasybulus of Miletus
- Thrasybulus of Syracuse
- Thrasyllus
- Thrasymachus
- Thrasymachus of Corinth
- Thrasymedes
- Thrasymedes (mythology)
- Thrax
- Three-Bodied Daemon
- Three Line Group
- Three-phase firing
- Thria (Attica)
- Thriasian Plain
- Thronium (Locris)
- Thucydides
- Thucydides, son of Melesias
- Thule
- Thumos
- Thyatira
- Thyestes
- Thyestes (Euripides)
- Thyia
- Thymaridas
- Thymbra
- Thymiaterion
- Thymochares
- Thymoetadae
- Thymoetes
- Thyreophoroi
- Thyreos
- Thyrgonidae
- Thyrsus
- Tiasa
- Timachidas of Rhodes
- Timaea, Queen of Sparta
- Timaeus (dialogue)
- Timaeus (historian)
- Timaeus of Locri
- Timaeus the Sophist
- Timagoras
- Timaios of Elis
- Timandra (mother of Neophron)
- Timanthes
- Timanthes of Cleonae
- Timanthes of Sicyon
- Timarchus of Miletus
- Timarete
- Timasitheus of Delphi
- Timasitheus of Lipara
- Timasitheus of Trapezus
- Timeline of ancient Greece
- Timeline of ancient Greek mathematicians
- Timeline of Athens
- Timeo Danaos et dona ferentes
- Timocharis
- Timoclea
- Timocleidas
- Timocles
- Timocracy
- Timocrates of Lampsacus
- Timocrates of Rhodes
- Timocrates of Syracuse
- Timocreon
- Timolaus of Cyzicus
- Timoleon
- Timomachus
- Timon of Athens (person)
- Timon of Phlius
- Timophanes
- Timotheus (aulist)
- Timotheus (general)
- Timotheus (sculptor)
- Timotheus of Miletus
- Timoxenos
- Timycha
- Tiphys
- Tiresias
- Tisamenus
- Tisamenus (King of Thebes)
- Tisamenus (son of Antiochus)
- Tisamenus (son of Orestes)
- Tisander
- Tisias
- Tisiphone
- Tisiphone (daughter of Alcmaeon)
- Titacidae
- Titanis (mythology)
- Titanomachy
- Titanomachy (epic poem)
- Titans
- Tithonos Painter
- Tithonus
- Titias
- Tityos
- Tityos Painter
- Tlepolemus
- Tleson
- Tmolus (mythology)
- Tmolus (son of Ares)
- Tolmides
- Tomb of Menecrates
- Toparches
- Tower of the Winds
- Toxaechmes
- Toxeus
- Toxotai
- Trachis (Phocis)
- Tractatus coislinianus
- Tragasus
- Tragic hero
- Trambelus
- Transcendentals
- Treasuries at Olympia
- Treasury of Atreus
- Treasury of Cyrene
- Treasury of the Acanthians
- Treasury of the Massaliots (Delphi)
- Treaty of Dardanos
- Trechus (mythology)
- Trial of Socrates
- Trick at Mecone
- Tricorythus
- Trident of Poseidon
- Trierarch
- Trierarchy
- Triglyph
- Trigonon
- Trinemeia
- Triopas
- Triopas of Argos
- Triphylia
- Triphylians
- Tripolis (region of Laconia)
- Triptolemos Painter
- Triptolemos (play)
- Triptolemus
- Trireme
- Tritaea (Achaea)
- Tritaea (Locris)
- Tritaea (Phocis)
- Tritagonist
- Triteia
- Triton
- Tritopatores
- Trittys
- Trochilus
- Troezen
- Troglodytae
- Troilus
- Troilus of Elis
- Trojan Battle Order
- Trojan Horse
- Trojan language
- Trojan Leaders
- Trojan War
- Trophimoi
- Trophonius
- Tros
- Tryphon (grammarian)
- Tübingen Hoplitodromos Runner
- Tunnel of Eupalinos
- Twelve Olympians
- Two-handled amphora (Boston 63.1515)
- Tyche
- Tychon
- Tydeus
- Tydeus Painter
- Tyllus
- Tympanum
- Tymphaea
- Tyndareus
- Types of Women
- Typhon
- Typology of Greek vase shapes
- Tyrannion of Amisus
- Tyrannus (mythology)
- Tyrant
- Tyrmeidae
- Tyro
- Tyros
- Tyrrhenian amphorae
- Tyrtaeus

== U ==
- Ucalegon
- Ula (Caria)
- Underworld Painter
- Unity of opposites
- Unmoved mover
- Upis
- Upper Agryle
- Upper Ancyle
- Upper Lamptrai
- Upper Paeania
- Upper Pergase
- Upper Potamus
- Upper World
- Upsilon
- Urania
- Urania (mythology)
- Uranium (Caria)
- Uranus
- Use of costume in Athenian tragedy

== V ==
- Valle dei Templi
- Valley of the Muses
- Vari Cave
- Varrese Painter
- Varvakeion Athena
- Vasiliki ware
- Velchanos
- Venus de' Medici
- Venus de Milo
- Vergina Sun
- Victoria Romana
- Victorious Youth
- Voidokilia beach
- Votive relief to Isis-Demeter, Dion
- Vrysinas

== W ==
- Wall Paintings of Thera
- Wandering womb
- War against Nabis
- Warfare in ancient Greek art
- Warfare in Minoan Art
- Warrior Vase
- Wars of Alexander the Great
- Wars of the Delian League
- Wars of the Diadochi
- Water (classical element)
- Ways and Means (Xenophon)
- The Weasel and Aphrodite
- Wedding of Ceyx
- Wedding Painter
- West Slope Ware
- Wheel of fire
- White ground technique
- Wild Goat Style
- Wine-dark sea (Homer)
- Winged Gorgoneion (Olympia B 110)
- Winged helmet
- Winged Victory of Samothrace
- Winnowing Oar
- Women in ancient Sparta
- Women in Classical Athens
- Women of Colchis
- Women of Trachis
- Works of Demosthenes

== X ==
- Xanthe (mythology)
- Xanthias
- Xanthika
- Xanthippe
- Xanthippe (mythology)
- Xanthippus
- Xanthippus of Carthage
- Xanthius
- Xanthos (King of Thebes)
- Xanthus
- Xanthus (historian)
- Xenagoras (geometer)
- Xenagoras (historian)
- Xenagus
- Xenarchus (strategos)
- Xenarchus (comic poet)
- Xenarchus of Seleucia
- Xenarius
- Xenelasia
- Xenia
- Xeniades
- Xenias of Arcadia
- Xenias of Elis
- Xenoclea
- Xenokleides
- Xenocles
- Xenocrates
- Xenocrates of Aphrodisias
- Xenodice
- Xenokles Painter
- Xenon (tyrant)
- Xenopatra
- Xenophanes
- Xenophilus (historian)
- Xenophilus (philosopher)
- Xenophilus (phrourarch)
- Xenophon
- Xenophon (son of Euripides)
- Xenophon of Aegium
- Xenophon of Corinth
- Xenophon of Ephesus
- Xenos
- Xerxes' Pontoon Bridges
- Xi (letter)
- Xiphos
- Xoanon
- Xuthus
- Xypete
- Xyston
- Xystus

== Y ==
- Yona
- YZ Group

== Z ==
- Zacynthus
- Zagreus
- Zakoros
- Zaleucus
- Zanes of Olympia
- Zarax
- Zarex
- Zariadres (mythology)
- Zeleia
- Zelus
- Zeno (physician)
- Zeno of Citium
- Zeno of Cyprus
- Zeno of Elea
- Zeno of Rhodes
- Zeno of Tarsus
- Zeno's paradoxes
- Zenobius
- Zenodorus
- Zenodotus
- Zenodotus (Stoic)
- Zephyrus
- Zereia
- Zeta
- Zeus
- Zeus Areius
- Zeus Georgos
- Zeuxidamus
- Zeuxippe
- Zeuxippus
- Zeuxippus of Heraclea
- Zeuxippus of Sicyon
- Zeuxis
- Zeuxis of Tarentum
- Zeuxo
- Zmaratha
- Zoilus
- Zone (colony)
- Zone (vestment)
- Zopyron
- Zopyrus (physician)
- Zoster (Attica)
- Zoster (costume)

== Lists ==
- Ancient Greek and Roman roofs
- Ancient Greek cities
- Ancient Greek monetary standards
- Ancient Greek philosophers
  - Cynic
  - Epicurean
  - Platonist
  - Stoic
- Ancient Greek playwrights
- Ancient Greek poets
- Ancient Greek temples
- Ancient Greek theatres
- Ancient Greek tribes
- Ancient Greek tyrants
- Ancient Greeks
- Kings of Athens
- Ancient Macedonians
- Ancient Olympic victors
- Greek mathematicians
- Greek mythological creatures
- Greek deities
- Mortals in Greek mythology
- Greek place names
- Greek phrases
- Greek vase painters
- Homeric characters
- Kings of Sparta
- Minor Greek mythological figures
- Oracular statements from Delphi
- Schools of philosophy
- Speakers in Plato's dialogues
- Stoae
- Thracian Greeks
- Trojan War characters

== See also ==
- Outline of ancient Greece
- Timeline of ancient Greece
