= Delos =

Island in Greece

Native name: Δήλος
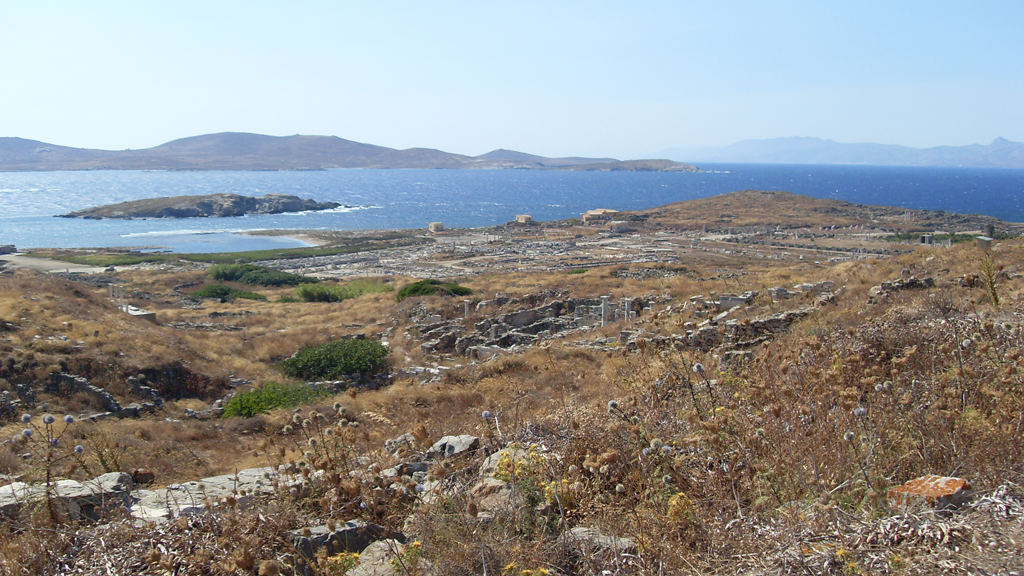
- General view of Delos

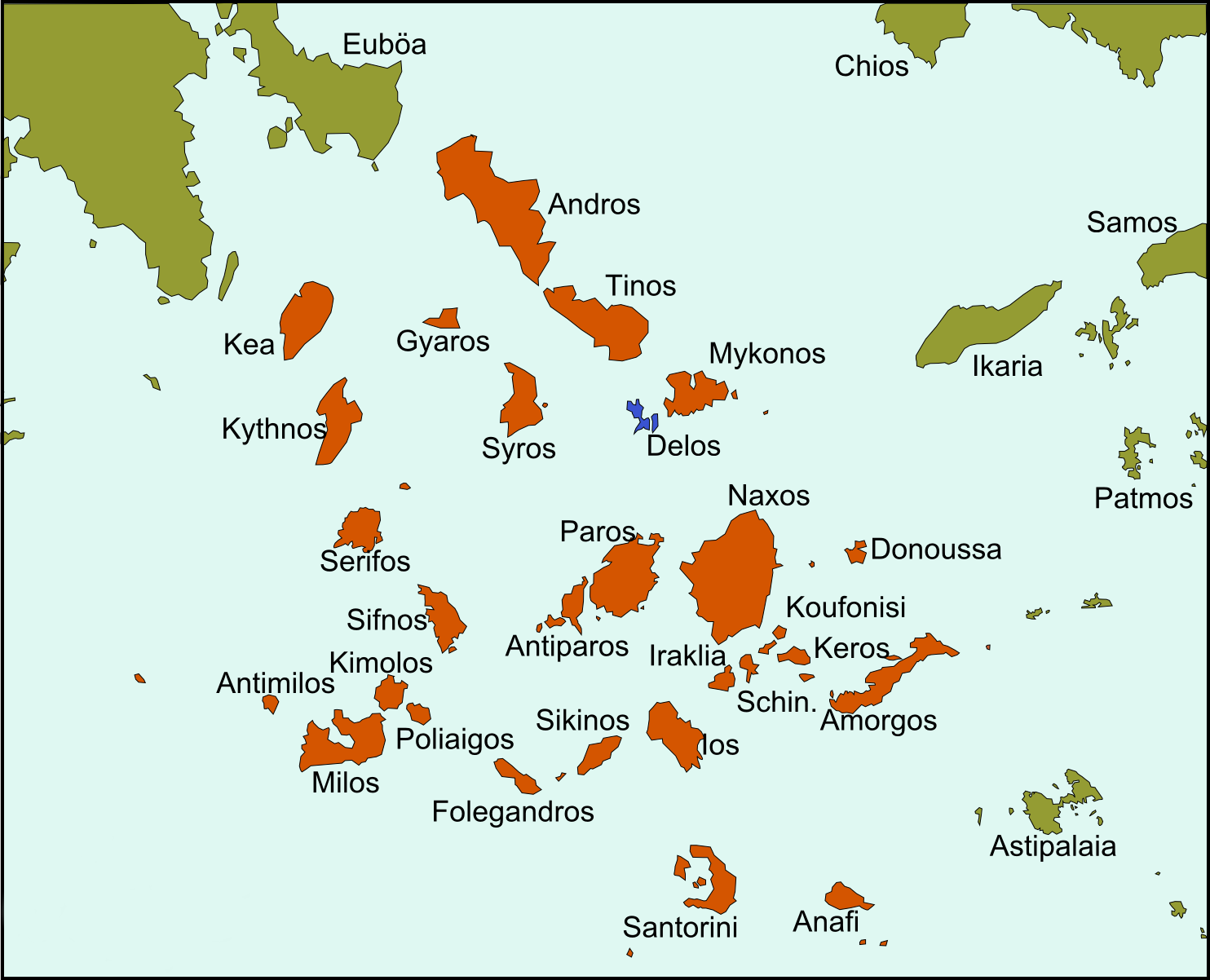
- Delos (on the right) and Rineia in the Cyclades

- Location within Greece

Geography
- Coordinates: 37°23′36″N 25°16′16″E
- Archipelago: Cyclades
- Total islands: 1
- Area: 3.43 km^{2} (1.32 sq mi)
- Highest elevation: 112 m (367 ft)
- Highest point: Mt. Kynthos

Administration
- Greece
- Region: South Aegean
- Regional unit: Mykonos

Demographics
- Population: 24 (2011)
- Pop. density: 6.7/km^{2} (17.4/sq mi)

UNESCO World Heritage Site
- Criteria: Cultural: ii, iii, iv, vi
- Reference: 530
- Inscription: 1990 (14th Session)

Delos or Dilos (/ˈdiːlɒs/; Greek: Δήλος [ˈðilos]; Attic Greek: Δῆλος Dêlos, Doric Greek: Δᾶλος Dâlos), is a small Greek island near Mykonos, close to the centre of the Cyclades archipelago. Though only 3.43 km^{2} (1.32 sq mi) in area, it is one of the most important mythological, historical, and archaeological sites in Greece. The ongoing excavations in the island are among the most extensive in the Mediterranean, and many of the artefacts found are displayed at the Archaeological Museum of Delos and the National Archaeological Museum of Athens.

Delos had a position as a holy sanctuary for a millennium before Olympian Greek mythology made it the birthplace of Apollo and Artemis. From its Sacred Harbour are visible the three conical mounds that have identified landscapes sacred to a goddess (presumably Athena). Another site, retaining its Pre-Greek name Mount Cynthus, is crowned with a sanctuary of Zeus.

In 1990, UNESCO added Delos to the World Heritage List, citing its exceptional archaeological site which "conveys the image of a great cosmopolitan Mediterranean port", its influence on the development of Greek architecture, and its sacred importance throughout Ancient Greece.

== History ==
=== Ancient Greece ===
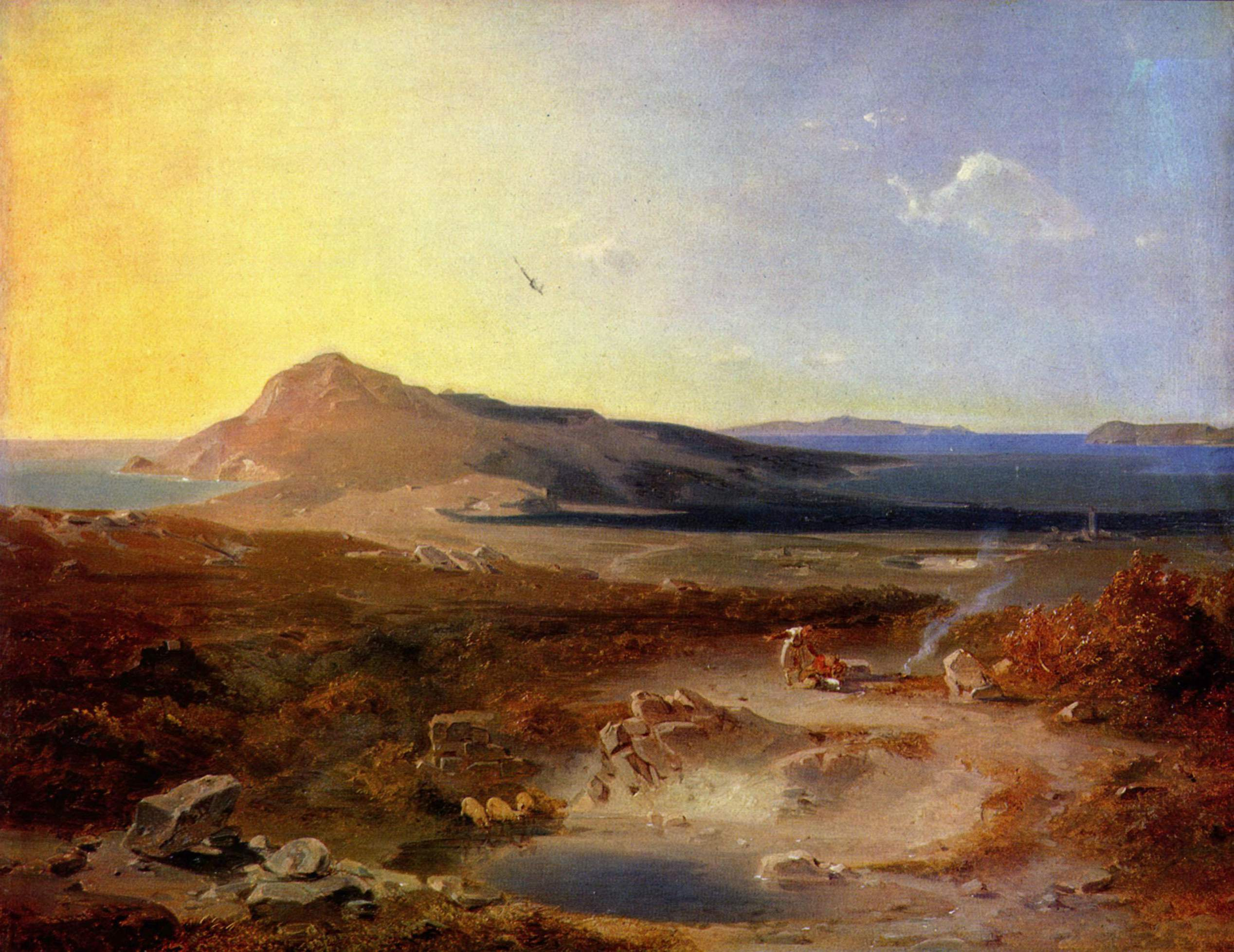
The island of Delos, Carl Anton Joseph Rottmann, 1847

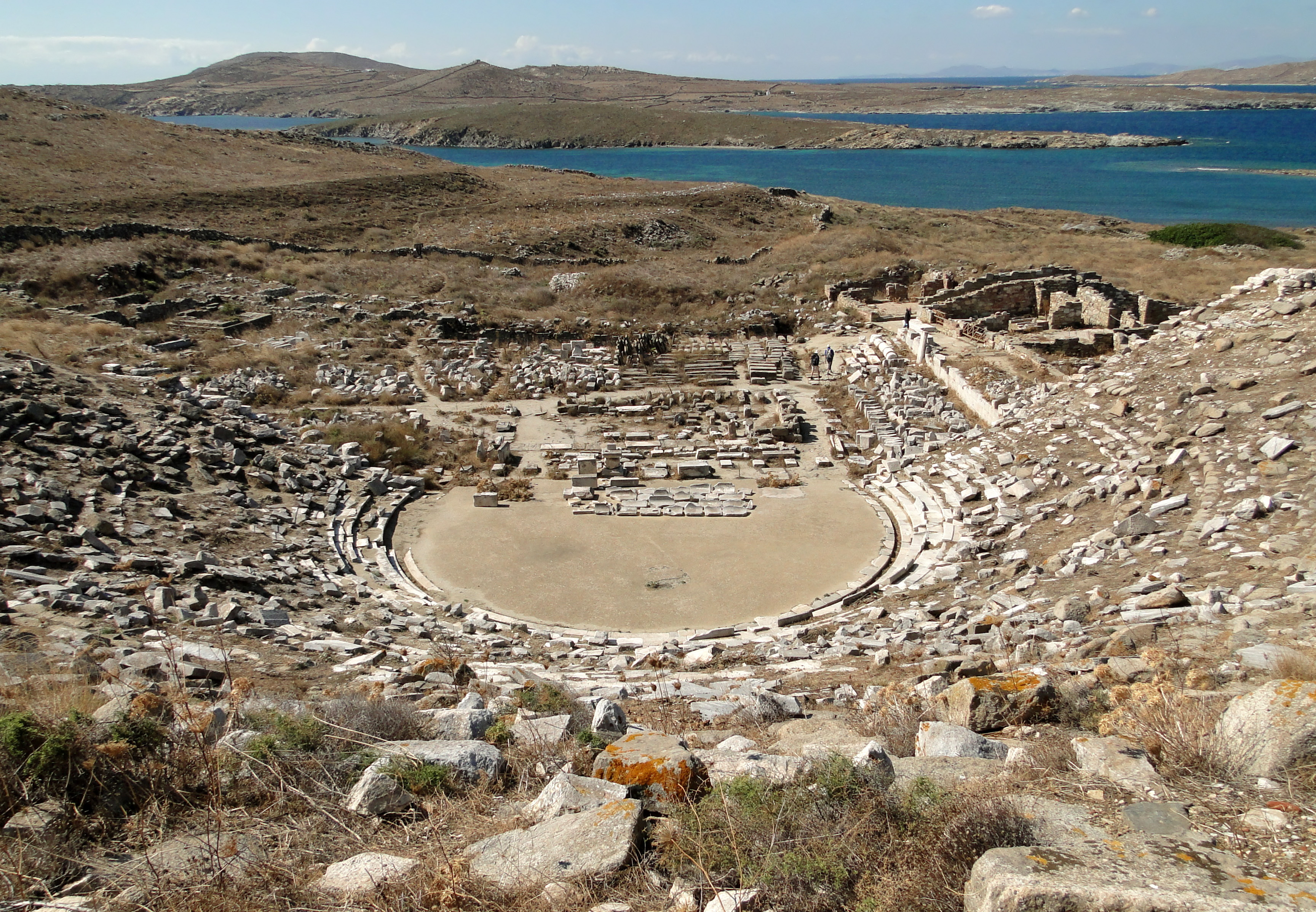
The theatre

Investigation of ancient stone huts found on the island indicate that it has been inhabited since the third millennium BC. Thucydides claims that the original inhabitants were piratical Carians who were eventually expelled by King Minos of Crete. By the writing of the Odyssey, the island was already famous as the birthplace of the twin gods Apollo and Artemis (although some confusion seems to exist of Artemis' birthplace being either Delos or the island of Ortygia).

Between 900 BC and 100 AD, Delos was a major cult centre, where the gods Dionysus and Leto, mother of the twin deities Apollo and Artemis, were revered. Eventually acquiring Panhellenic religious significance, Delos was initially a religious pilgrimage for the Ionians.

A number of "purifications" were performed by the city-state of Athens in an attempt to render the island fit for the proper worship of the gods. These first took place in the 6th century BC, directed by the tyrant Pisistratus, who ordered that all graves within sight of the temple be dug up and the bodies moved to another nearby island. In the fifth century BC, during the sixth year of the Peloponnesian War and under instruction from the Delphic Oracle, the entire island was purged of all dead bodies. A new decree was eventually issued, so that no one should be allowed to be buried or give birth on the island due to its sacred importance, and to preserve its neutrality in commerce since no one could then claim ownership through inheritance. Two tombs were spared—those of the Hyperborean Maidens—due to the presence of a hero cult around them. Immediately after this purification, the first quinquennial festival of the Delian games was celebrated there. Four years later, all inhabitants of the island were removed to Adramyttium in Asia as a further purification.

After the Persian Wars, the island became the natural meeting ground for the Delian League, founded in 478 BC, the congresses being held in the temple (a separate quarter was reserved for foreigners and the sanctuaries of foreign deities). The league's common treasury was kept here as well until 454 BC, when Pericles removed it to Athens.

During the Hellenistic period, a well-established Phoenician colony on the island had extensive trade relations. Epigraphic evidence also suggests the presence of a Samaritan community on Delos during this period. Two marble stelae dated on paleographic grounds to c. 250–175 BCE and c. 150–50 BCE, record benefactions by Cretan donors to a proseuche ("house of prayer"). In the inscriptions, the community identified itself as "Israelites on Delos who make offerings to hallowed Argarizein," a clear reference to Mount Gerizim, site of the Samaritan sanctuary. There is also evidence for Jewish presence: two Jewish women, Heraclea and Marthina, are documented at Delos. Delos is also the findspot of an inscription honoring Herod the Great, King of Judaea, as well as another honoring his son, the tetrarch Herod Antipas, located in the Temple of Apollo.

The island had no productive capacity for food, fibre, or timber, which were all imported. Limited water was exploited with an extensive cistern and aqueduct system, wells, and sanitary drains. Various regions operated agorae (markets).

Suda writes that the Greeks used the proverb "ᾌδεις ὥσπερ εἰς Δῆλον πλέων", meaning you sing as if sailing into Delos in reference to someone who is happy, light-hearted, and enjoying himself.

Iamblichus writes that Delos Mysteries (similar to the Eleusinian Mysteries) were established.

Semos of Delos (Σῆμος ὁ Δήλιος) wrote many works, including 8 books about the history of Delos. The Suda mistakenly lists him as being from Elis.

=== Roman era ===
Strabo writes that in 166 BC, the Romans converted Delos into a free port, which was partially motivated by seeking to damage the trade of Rhodes, at the time the target of Roman hostility. In 167 or 166 BC, after the Roman victory in the Third Macedonian War, the Roman Republic ceded Delos to the Athenians, who expelled most of the original inhabitants. Roman traders came to purchase tens of thousands of slaves captured by the Cilician pirates or captured in the wars following the disintegration of the Seleucid Empire. It became the centre of the slave trade, with the largest slave market in the larger region being maintained here.

The Roman destruction of Corinth in 146 BC allowed Delos to at least partially assume Corinth's role as the premier trading centre of Greece, but Delos' commercial prosperity, construction activity, and population waned significantly after the island was assaulted by the forces of Mithridates VI of Pontus in 88 and 69 BC, during the Mithridatic Wars with Rome. Before the end of the first century BC, trade routes had changed; Delos was replaced by Puteoli as the chief focus of Italian trade with the east, and as a cult centre, too, it entered a sharp decline.

Despite its decline, Delos maintained some population in the early Roman Imperial period. Pausanias (8,33,2), writing in the second century AD, states that Delos was uninhabited apart from a few custodians of the sanctuaries. Evidence has been found of Roman baths, coins, an aqueduct, residential and elite houses, multiple churches, basilicas, and a monastery all from the first to sixth centuries AD, which, however, does not suggest that the island was continuously inhabited in the period. The pottery found indicates that produce, such as wine and oil, continued to be imported from regional centres. Also, a number of wine presses were found amidst the ruins of the ancient city that date to this period, suggesting that the population at this time was engaged in considerable viticultural endeavour.

Delos was eventually abandoned around the eighth century AD.

== Landmarks ==
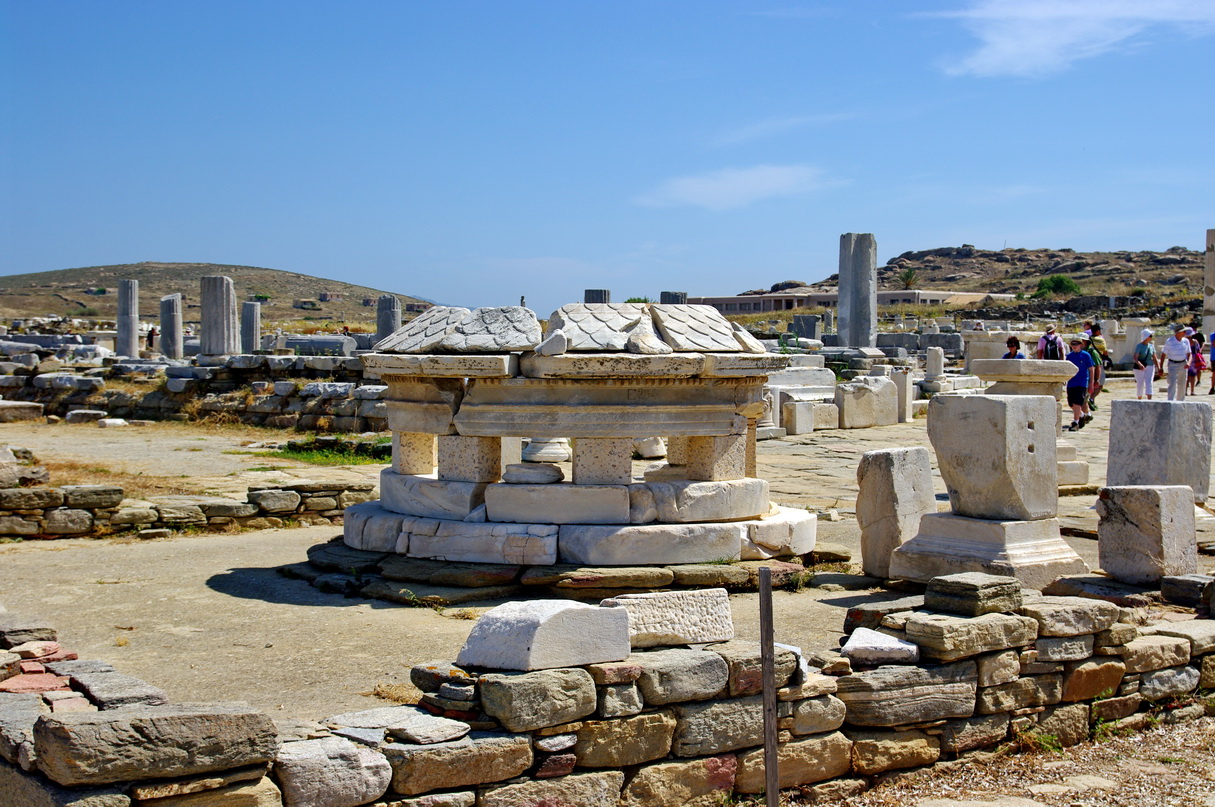
The Agora of the Competaliasts

- The small sacred lake in its circular bowl, now intentionally left dry by the island's caretakers to suppress the spread of malaria-bearing mosquitoes, is a topographical feature that determined the placement of later features.
- The Minoan Fountain was a rectangular public well hewn in the rock, with a central column; it formalized the sacred spring in its present sixth-century BC form, reconstructed in 166 BC, according to an inscription. Tightly laid courses of masonry form the walls; water can still be reached by a flight of steps that fill one side.
- Several market squares were found. The Hellenistic Agora of the Competaliasts by the Sacred Harbour retains the postholes for market awnings in its stone paving. Two powerful Italic merchant guilds dedicated statues and columns there. The so-called "Agora of the Italians" was probably not a agora, despite its common appellation in modern literature.
- The Temple of the Delians, dedicated to Apollo, is a classic example of the Doric order. Beside the temple, once stood a colossal kouros of Apollo, only parts of which remain. Dating to the sixth century BC, parts of the upper torso and pelvis remain in situ, a hand is kept at the local museum, and a foot is in the British Museum.

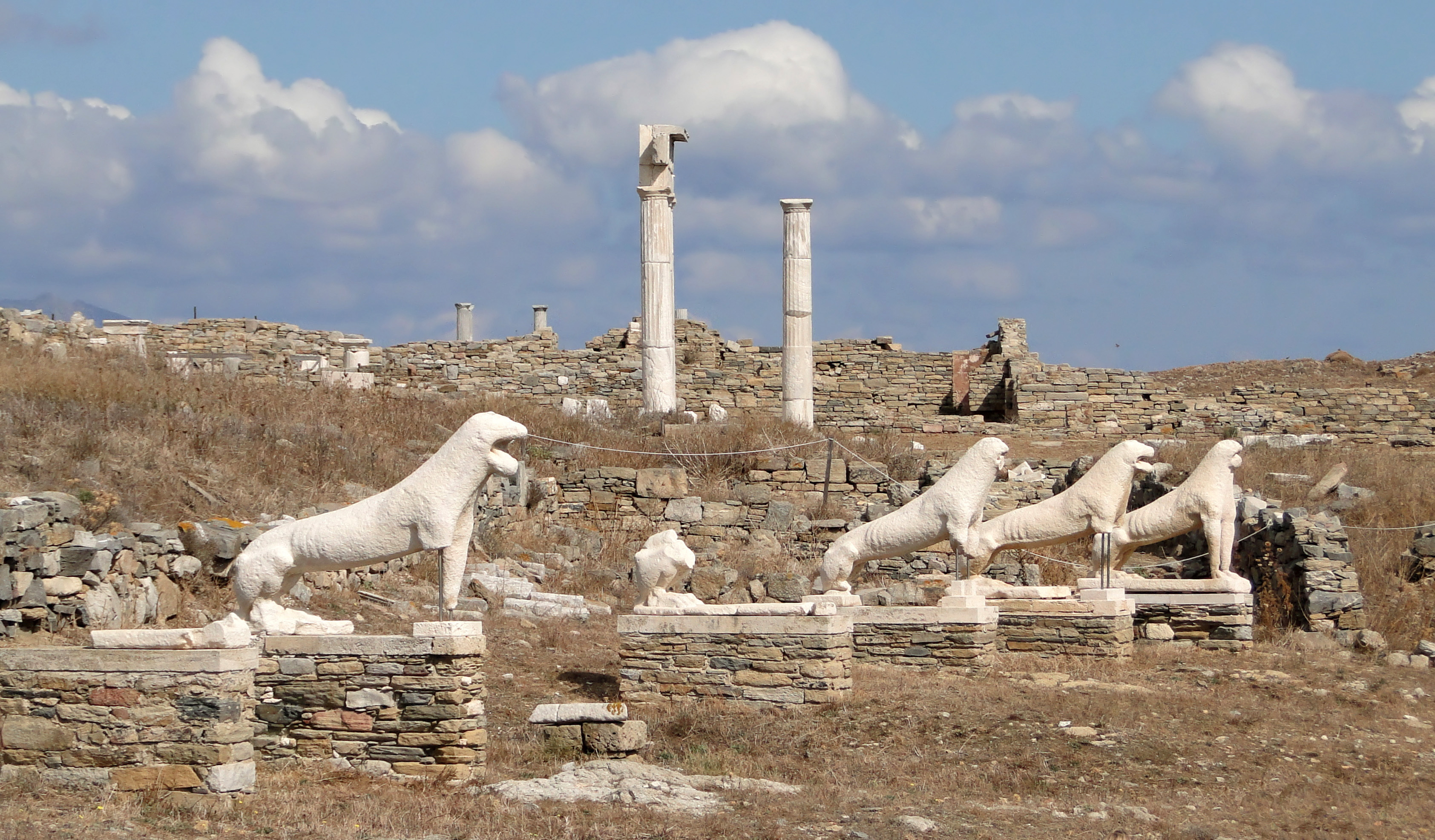
The Terrace of the Lions

- The Terrace of the Lions, also was dedicated to Apollo by the people of Naxos shortly before 600 BC. It originally had 9–12 squatting, snarling marble guardian lions along the Sacred Way; one was removed and is presently situated over the main gate of the Venetian Arsenal. The lions create a monumental avenue comparable to Egyptian avenues of sphinxes. (A Greek sphinx is in the Delos Museum.) Today, only seven of the original lions remain.
- The Oikos of the Naxians (House of the Naxians), first quarter of sixth century BC, has a long hall with one central ionic colonnade, a west porch tristyle in antis, and an east marble prostasis of the middle of the sixth century BC.
- The Establishment of the Poseidoniasts, clubhouse of "the Koinon of the Berytian Poseidoniast merchants, shipmasters, and warehousemen", during the early years of Roman hegemony, late 2nd century BC. To their protective triad of Baal/Poseidon, Astarte/Aphrodite and Eshmun/Asklepios, they added Roma.

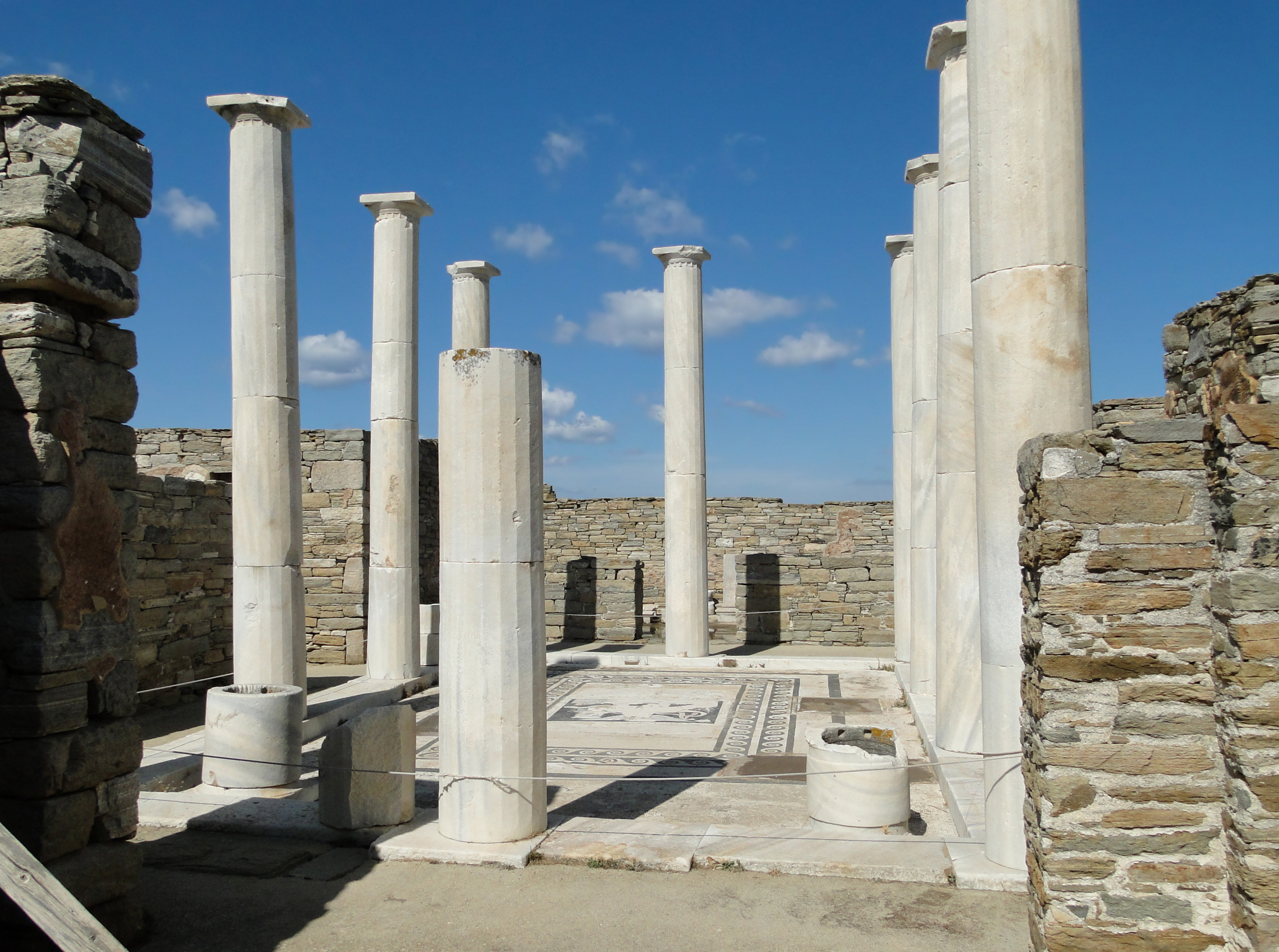
The 'house of Dionysus' named after a mosaic of Greek god Dionysus riding a panther

- The Doric Temple of Isis was built on a high, overlooking hill at the beginning of the Roman period to venerate the familiar trinity of Isis, the Alexandrian Serapis, and Anubis.
- The Temple of Hera, circa 500 BC, is a rebuilding of an earlier Heraion on the site.
- The House of Dionysus is a luxurious second-century private house named for the floor mosaic of Dionysus riding a panther.
- The House of the Dolphins is similarly named from its atrium mosaic, where erotes ride dolphins; its Phoenician owner commissioned a floor mosaic of Tanit in his vestibule.
- The Stoivadeion dedicated to Dionysus bears a statue of the god of wine and the life-force. On either side of the platform, a pillar supports a colossal phallus, the symbol of Dionysus. The southern pillar, which is decorated with relief scenes from the Dionysiac circle, was erected around 300 BC to celebrate a winning theatrical performance. The statue of Dionysus was originally flanked by those of two actors impersonating Paposilenoi (conserved in the Archaeological Museum of Delos). The marble theatre is a rebuilding of an older one, undertaken shortly after 300 BC.
- The "Delos Synagogue", the ruins of what was once believed to be an ancient Samaritan synagogue.

== Current population ==
The 2001 Greek census reported a population of 14 inhabitants on the island. The island is administratively a part of the municipality of Mýkonos.

According to more recent numbers, in 2011 the island counted 24 inhabitants.

== Gallery ==
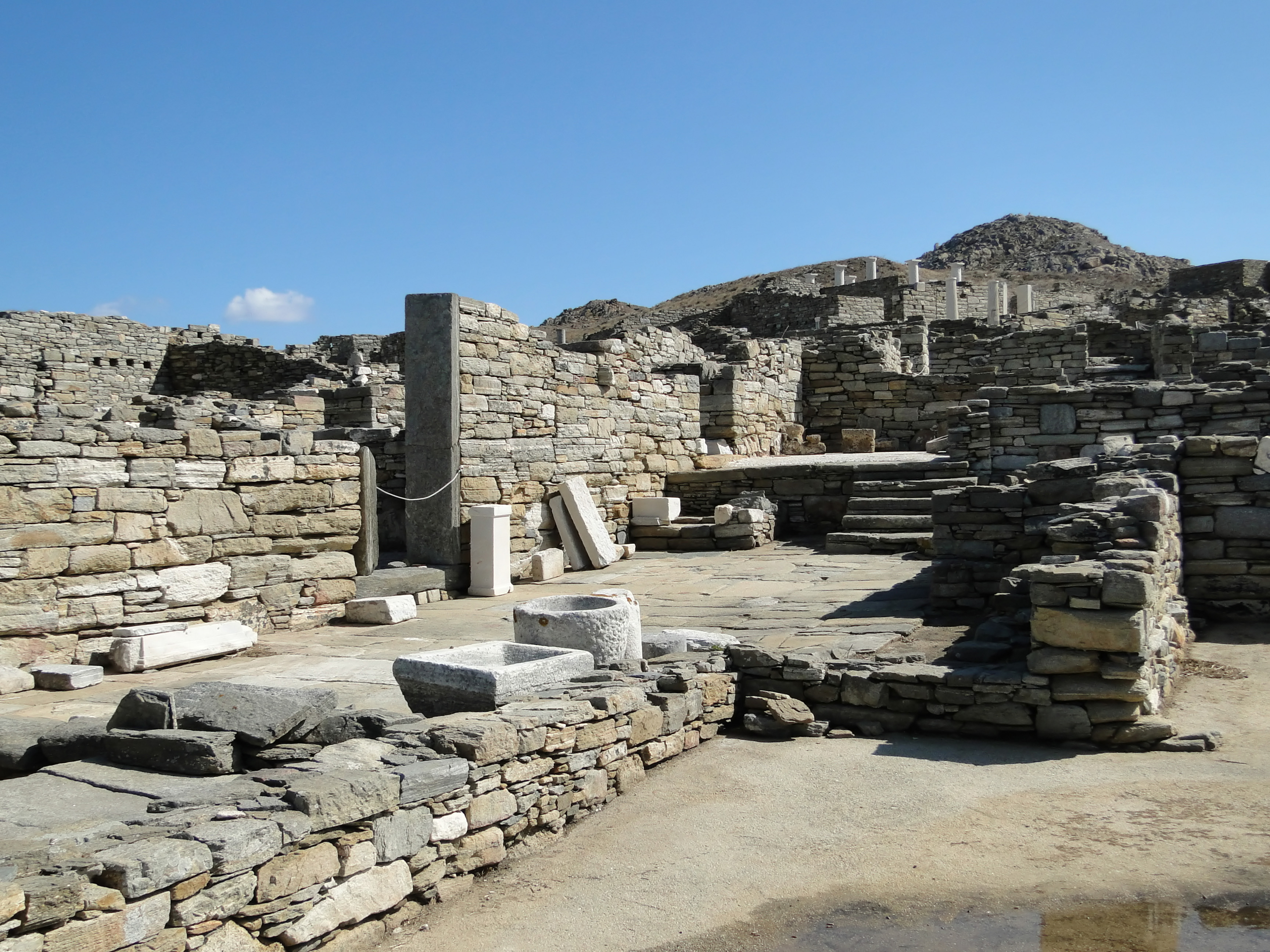
The Theatre Quarter

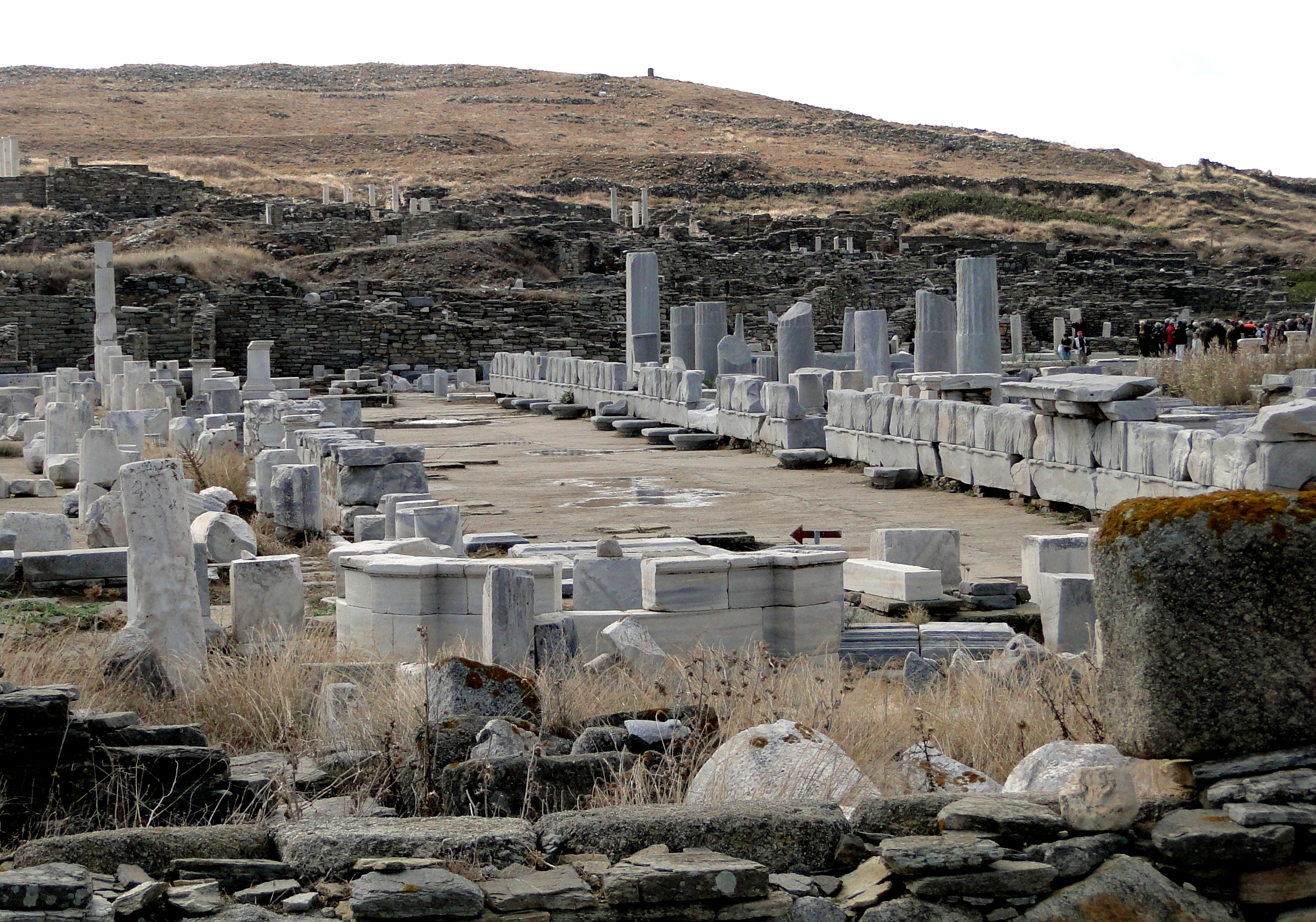
Sacred Way

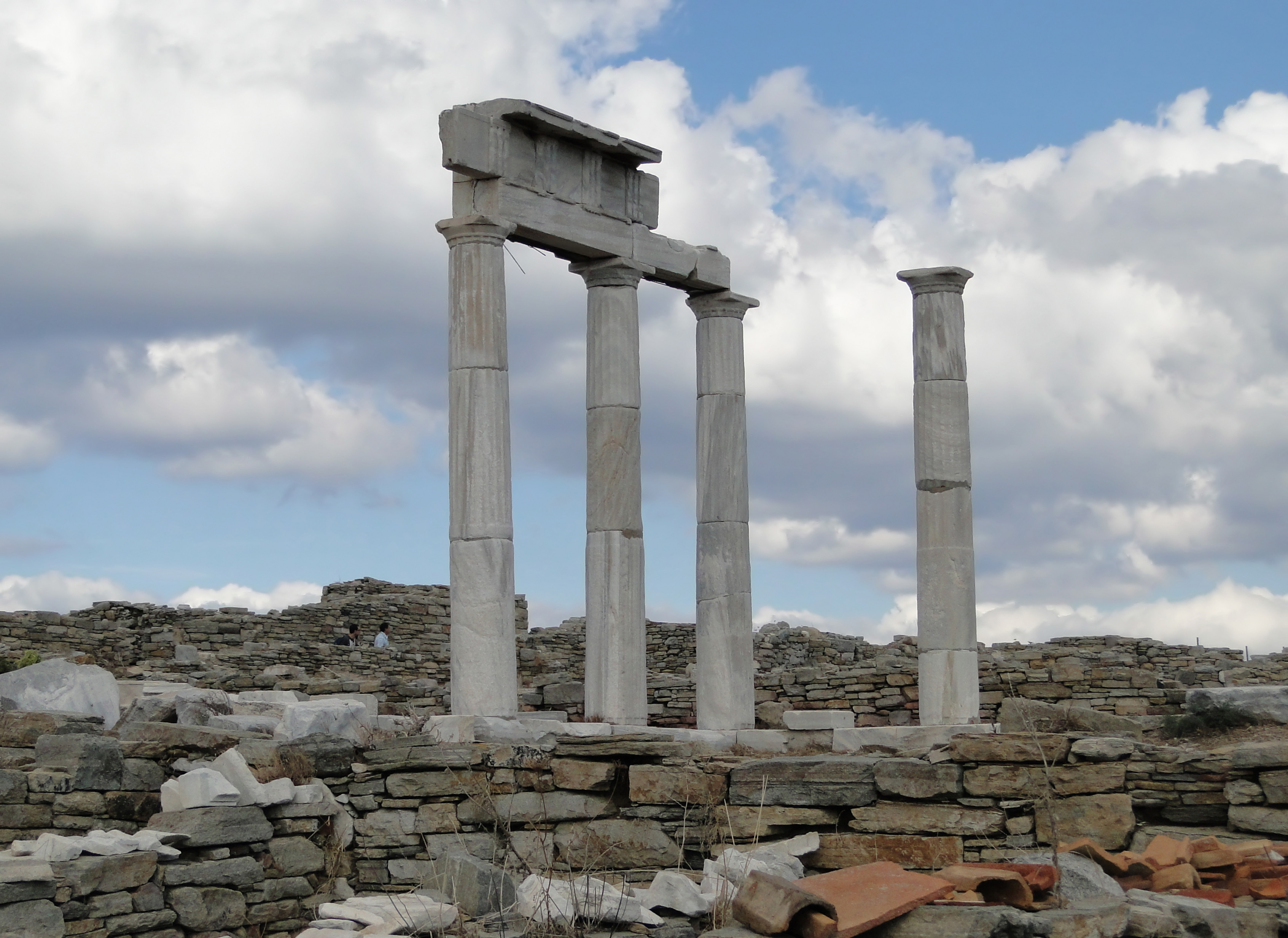
Establishment of the Poseidoniasts

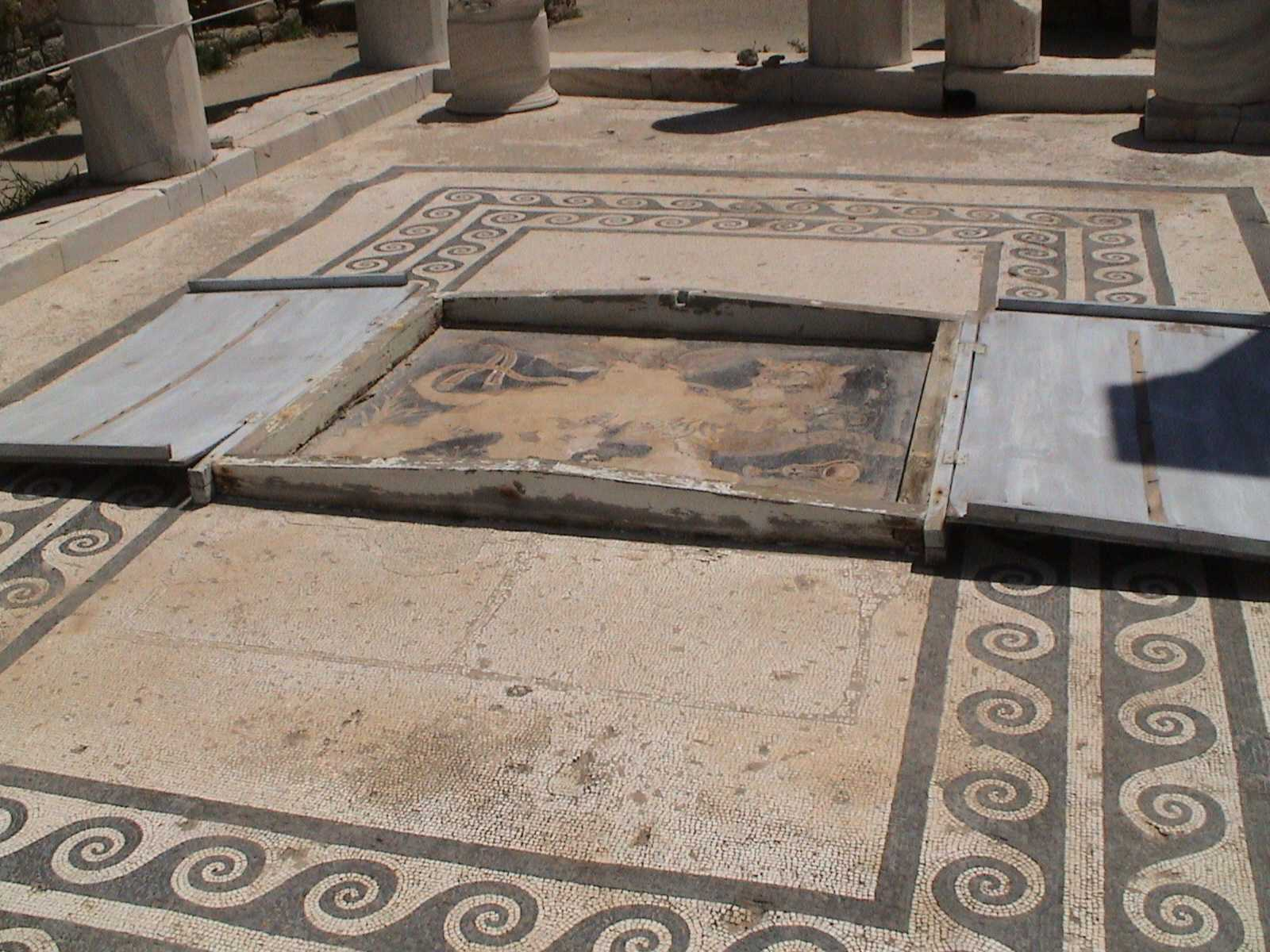
House of Dionysus floor mosaic

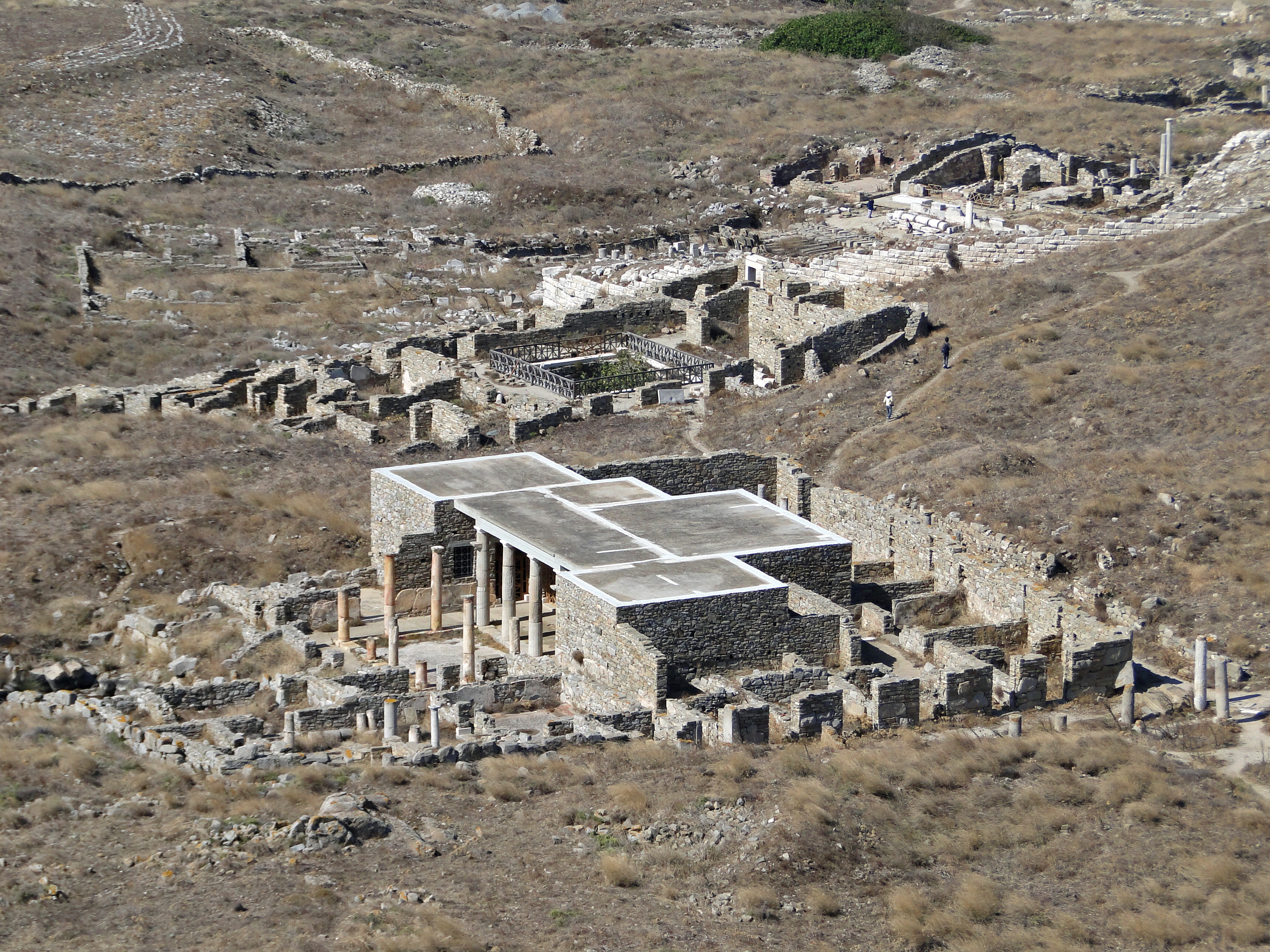
House of the Masks

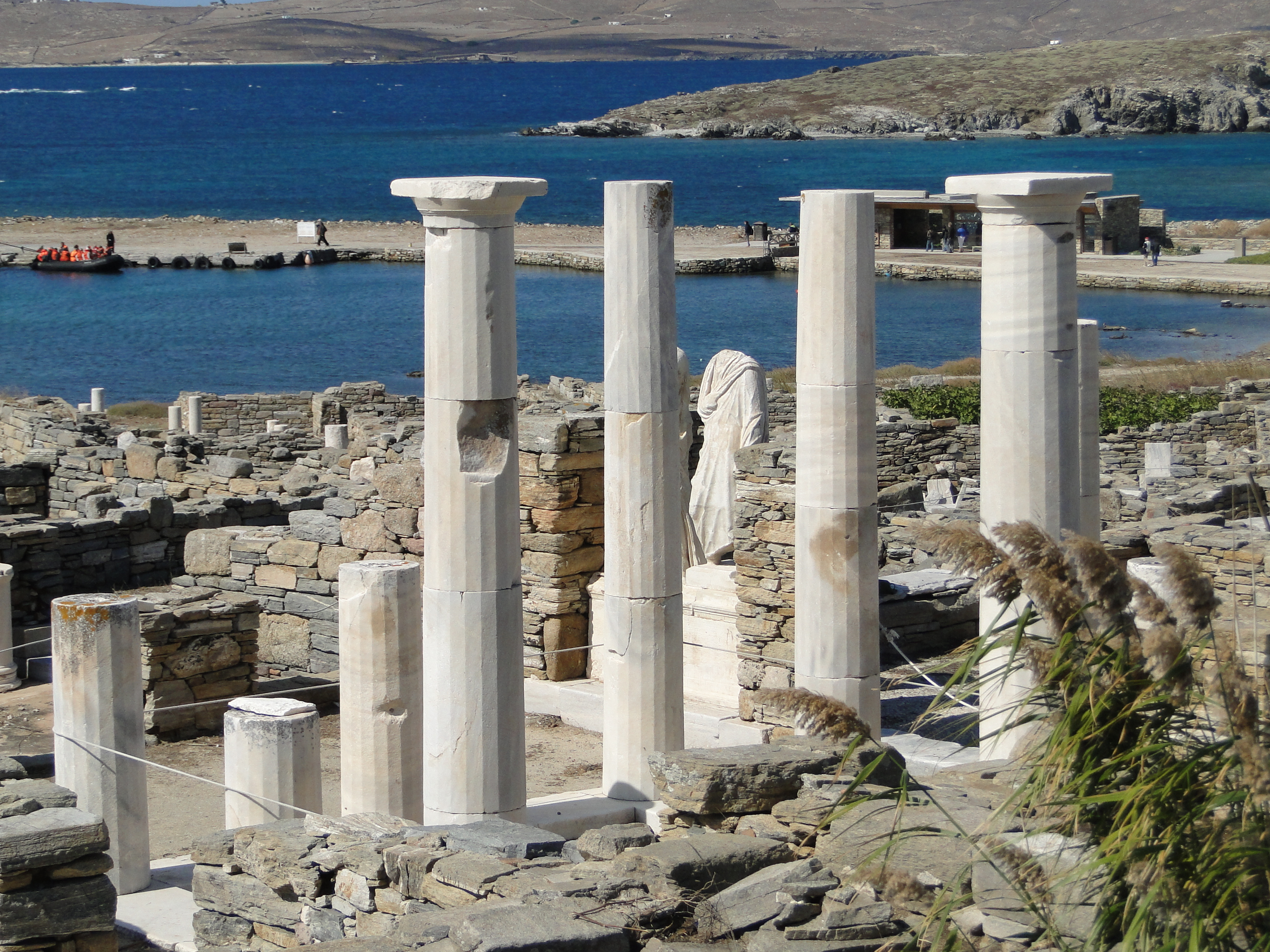
House of Cleopatra

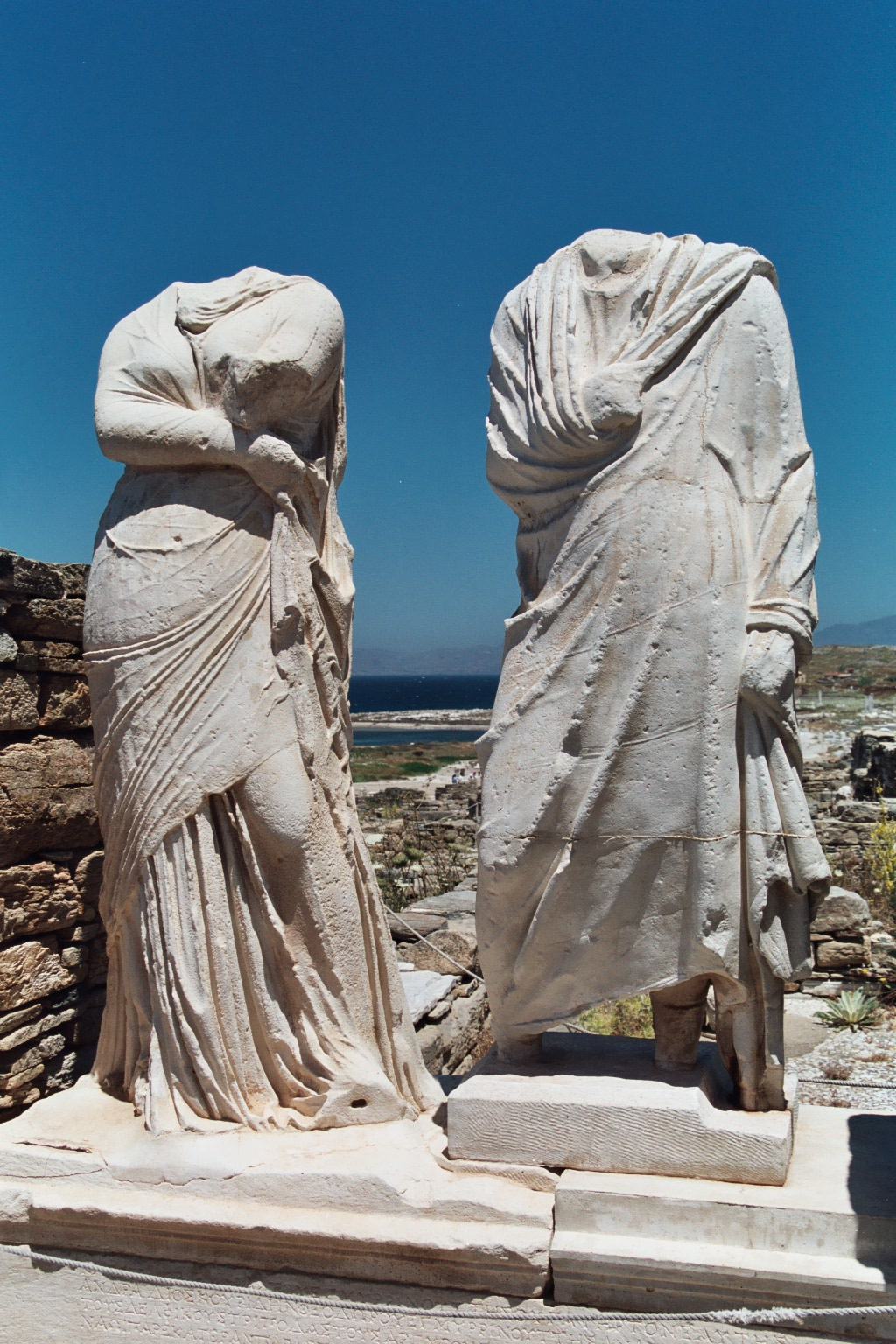
Statues at the House of Cleopatra

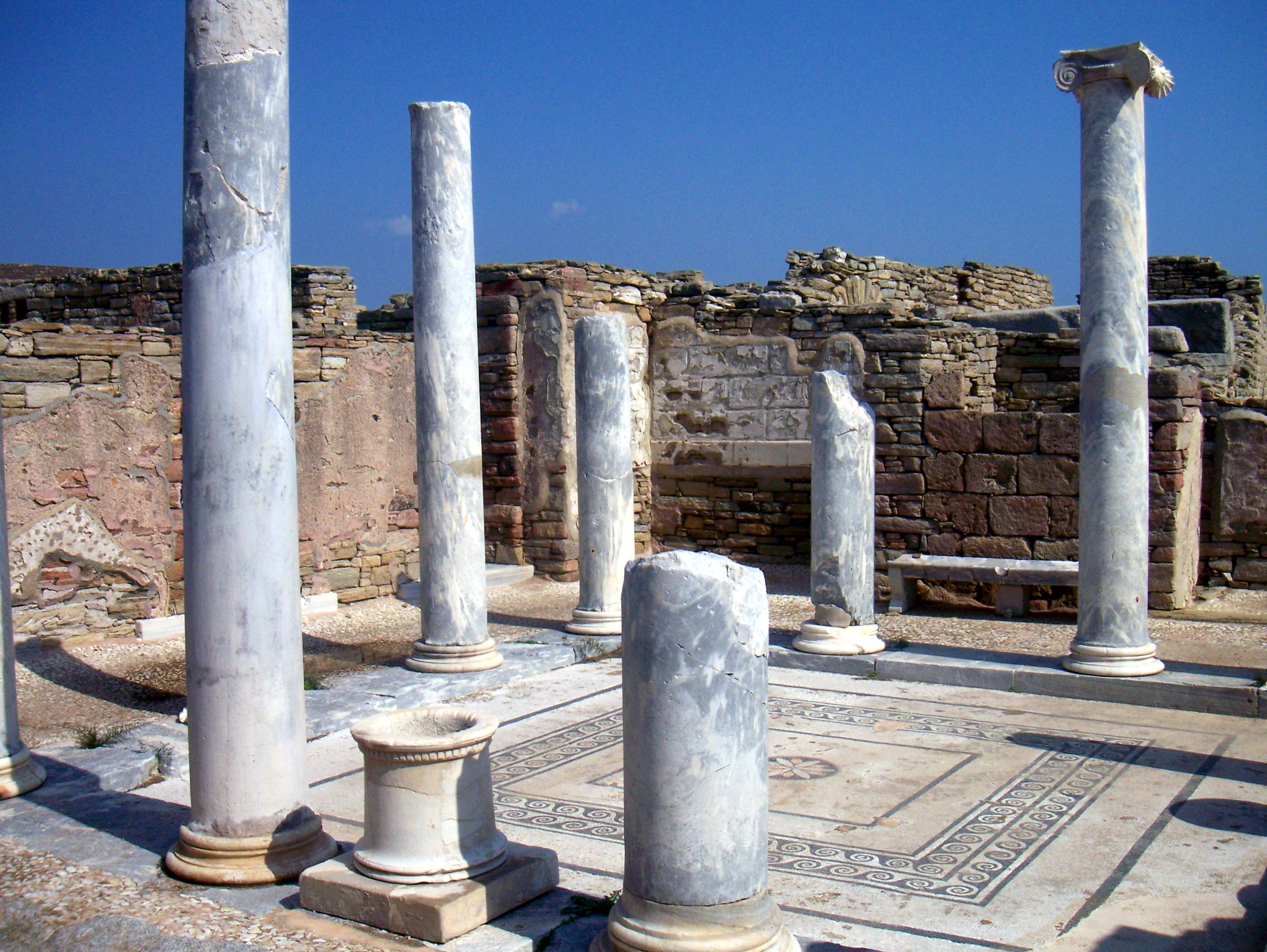
House of the Lake

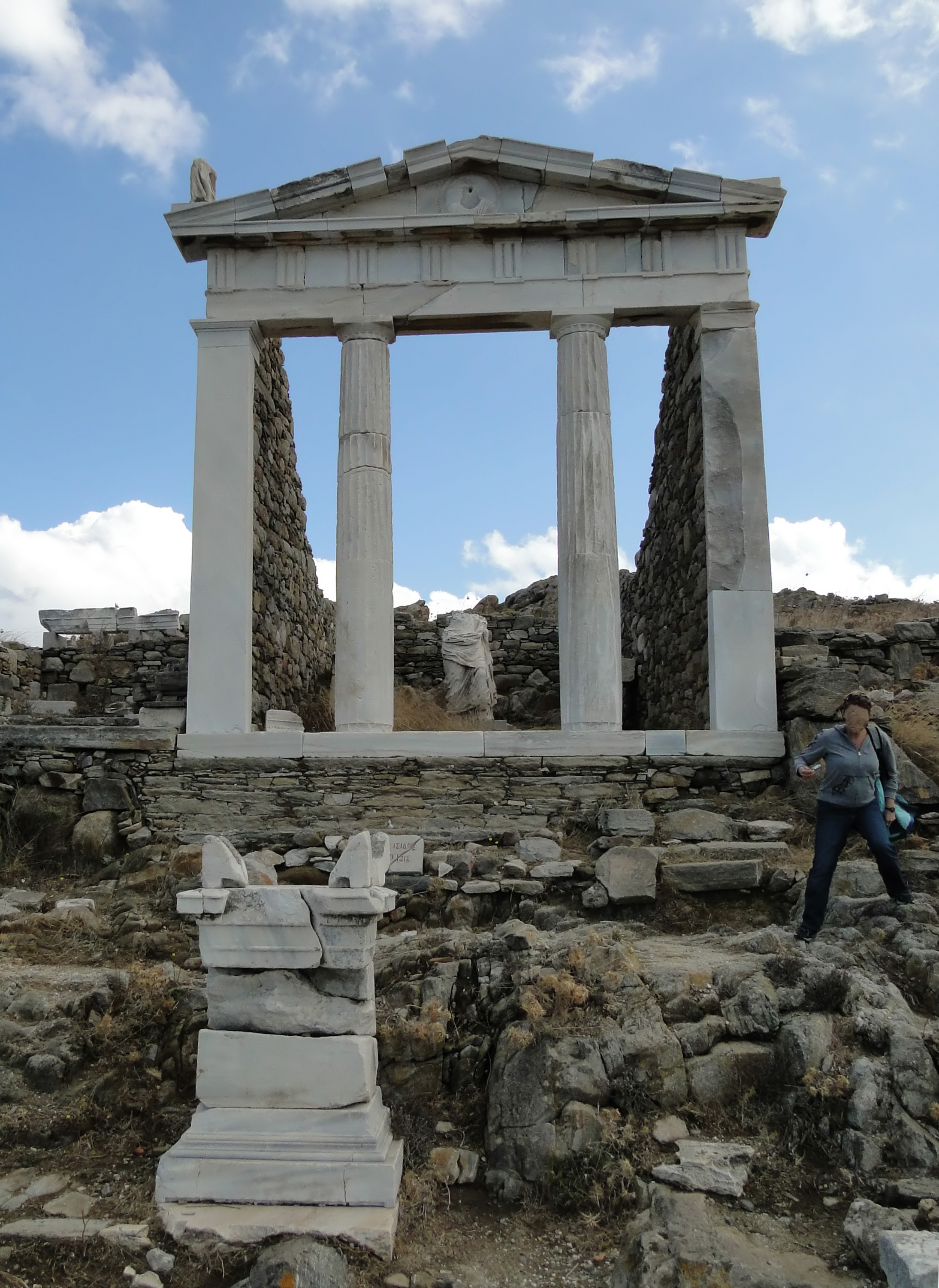
Temple of Isis

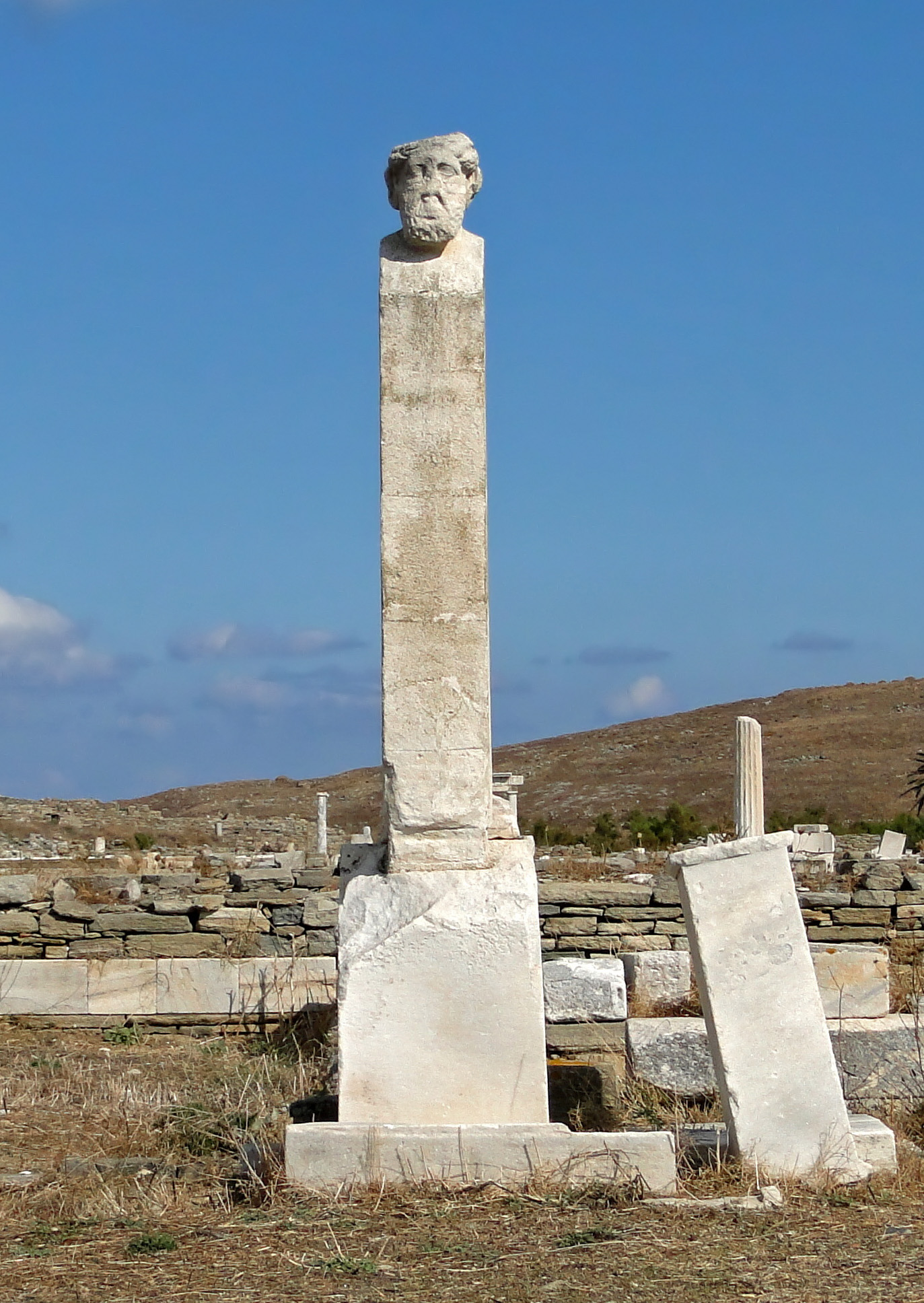
Bust of Hermes

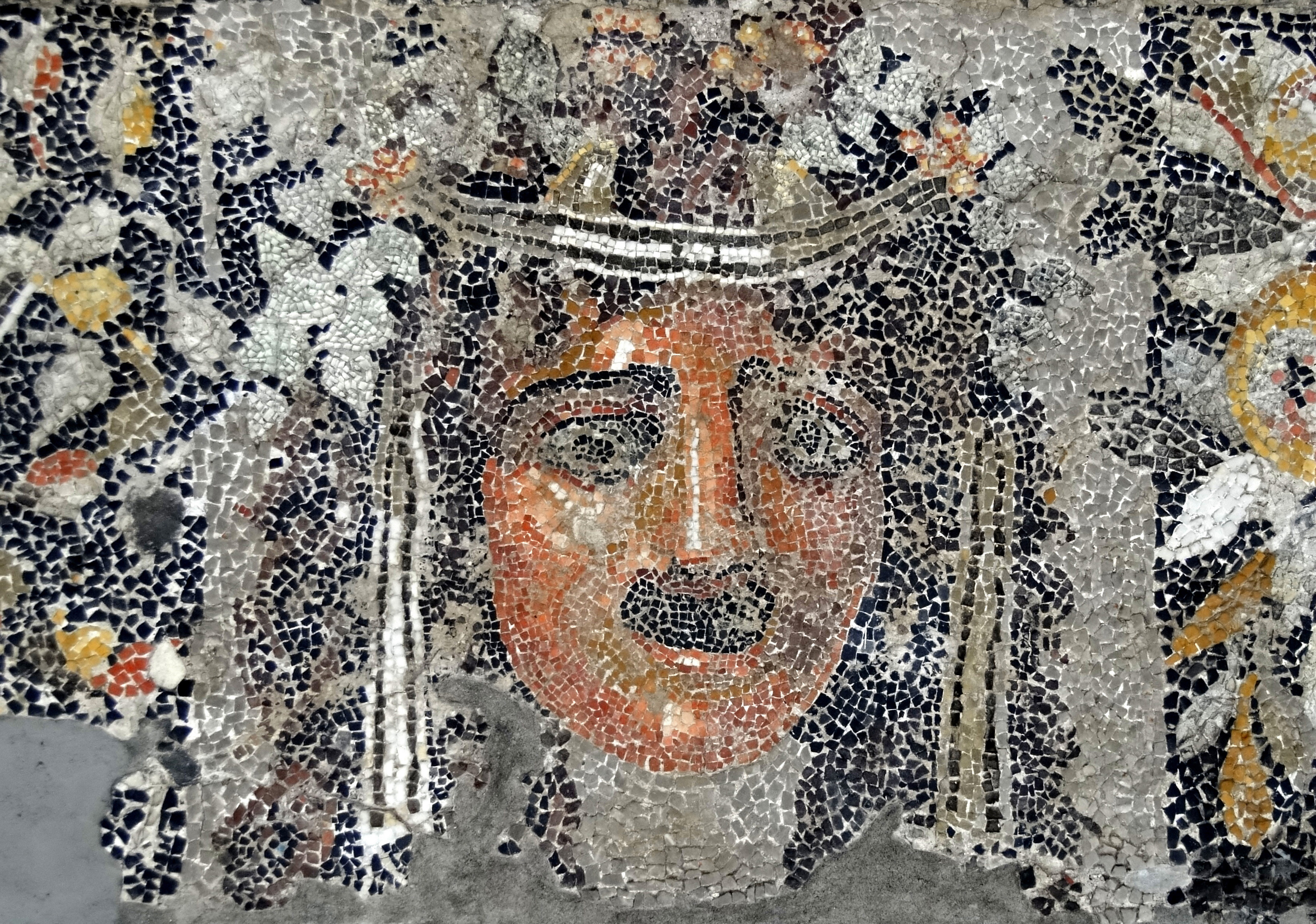
Mosaic from the Insula of the Jewellery

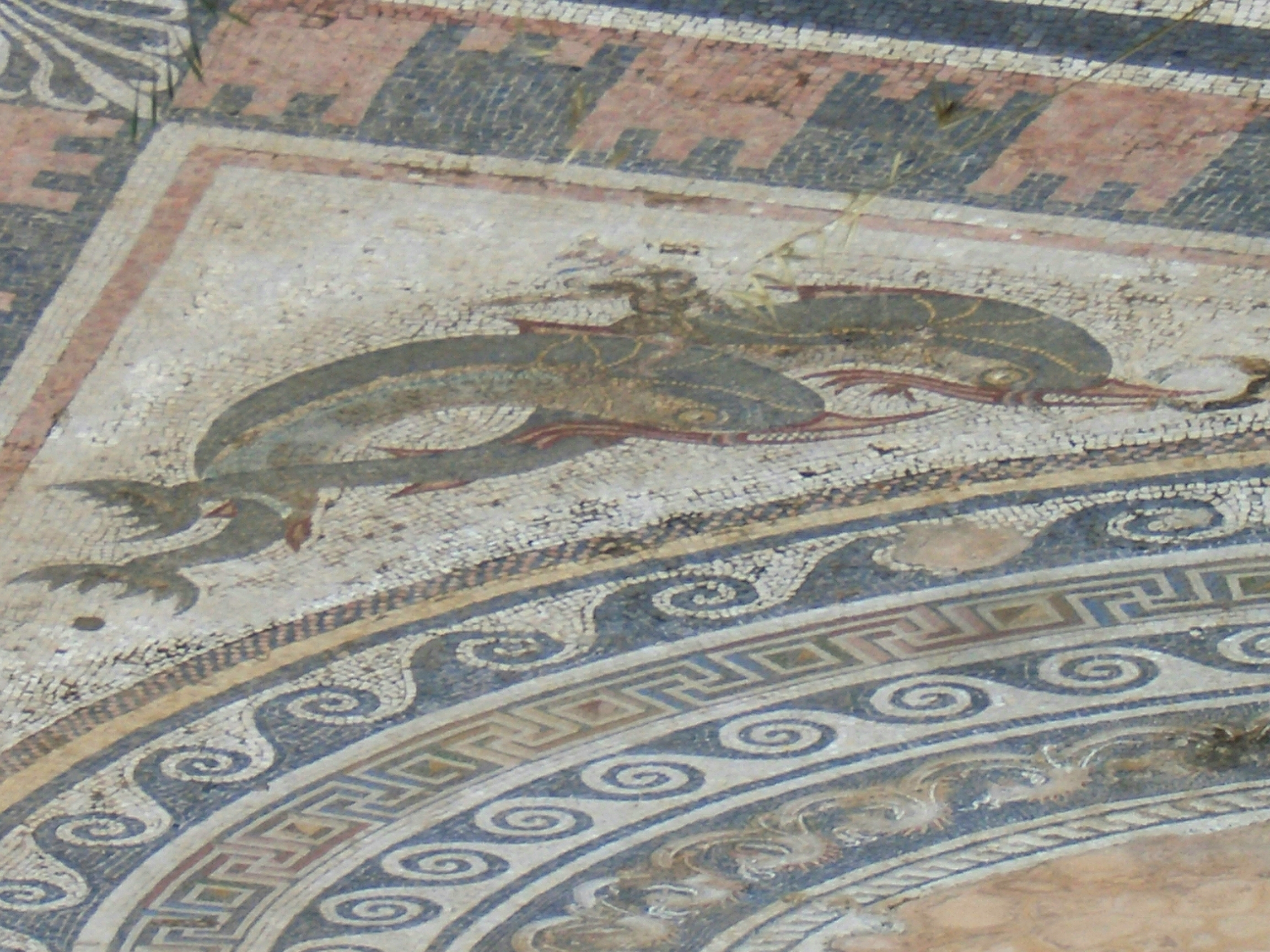
A mosaic on the floor of the House of the Dolphins

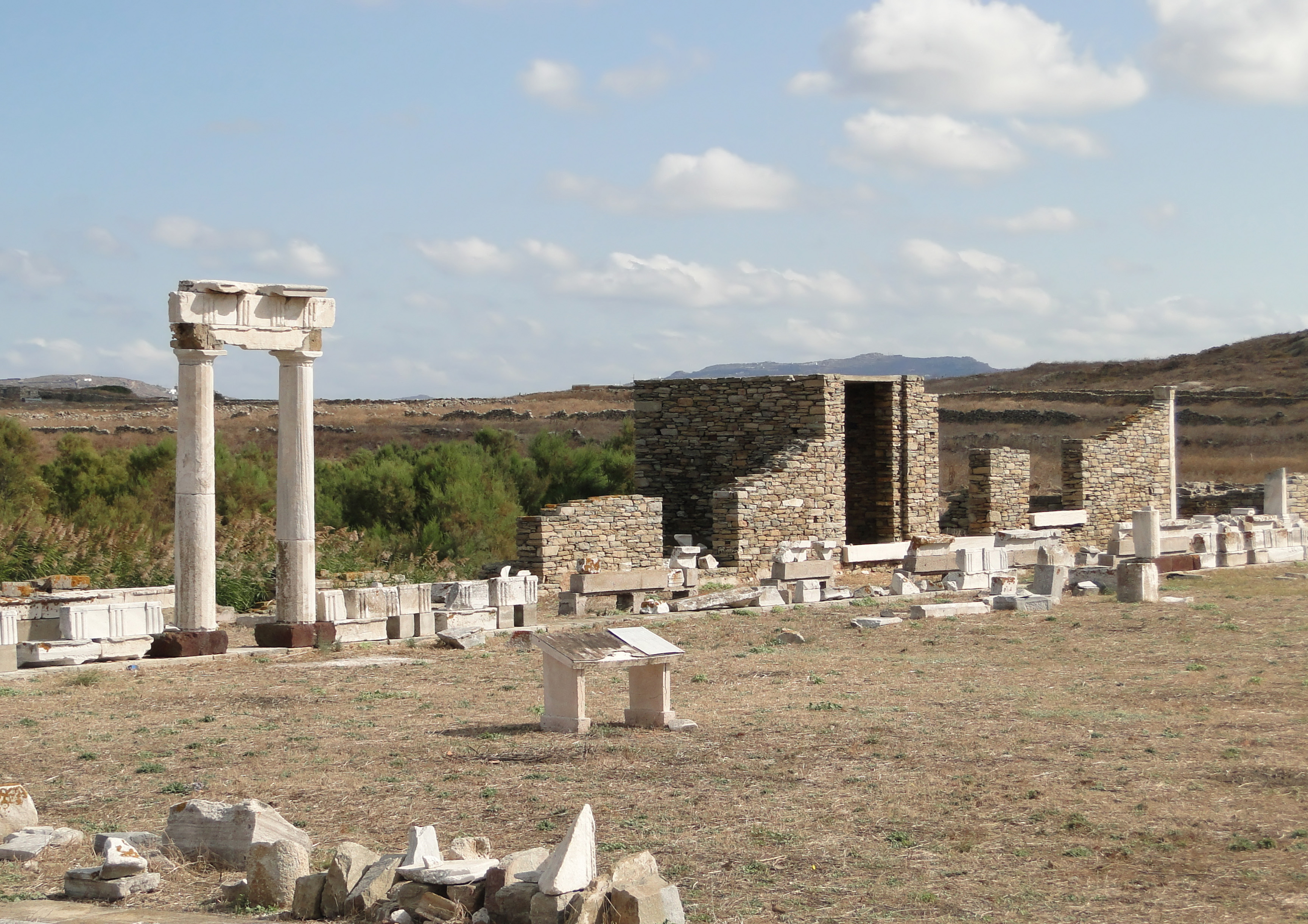
Agora of the Italians

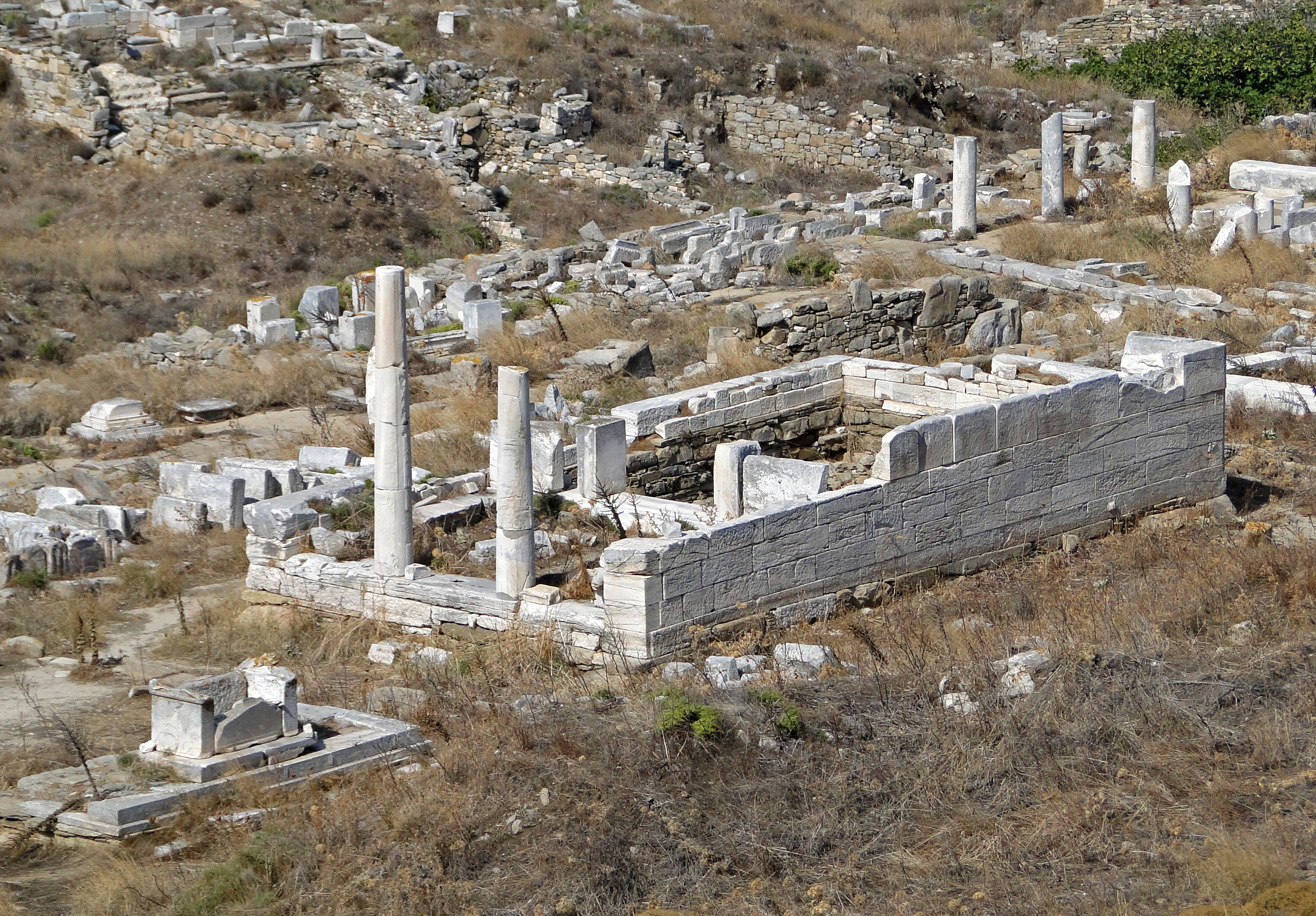
Heraion (Temple of Hera)

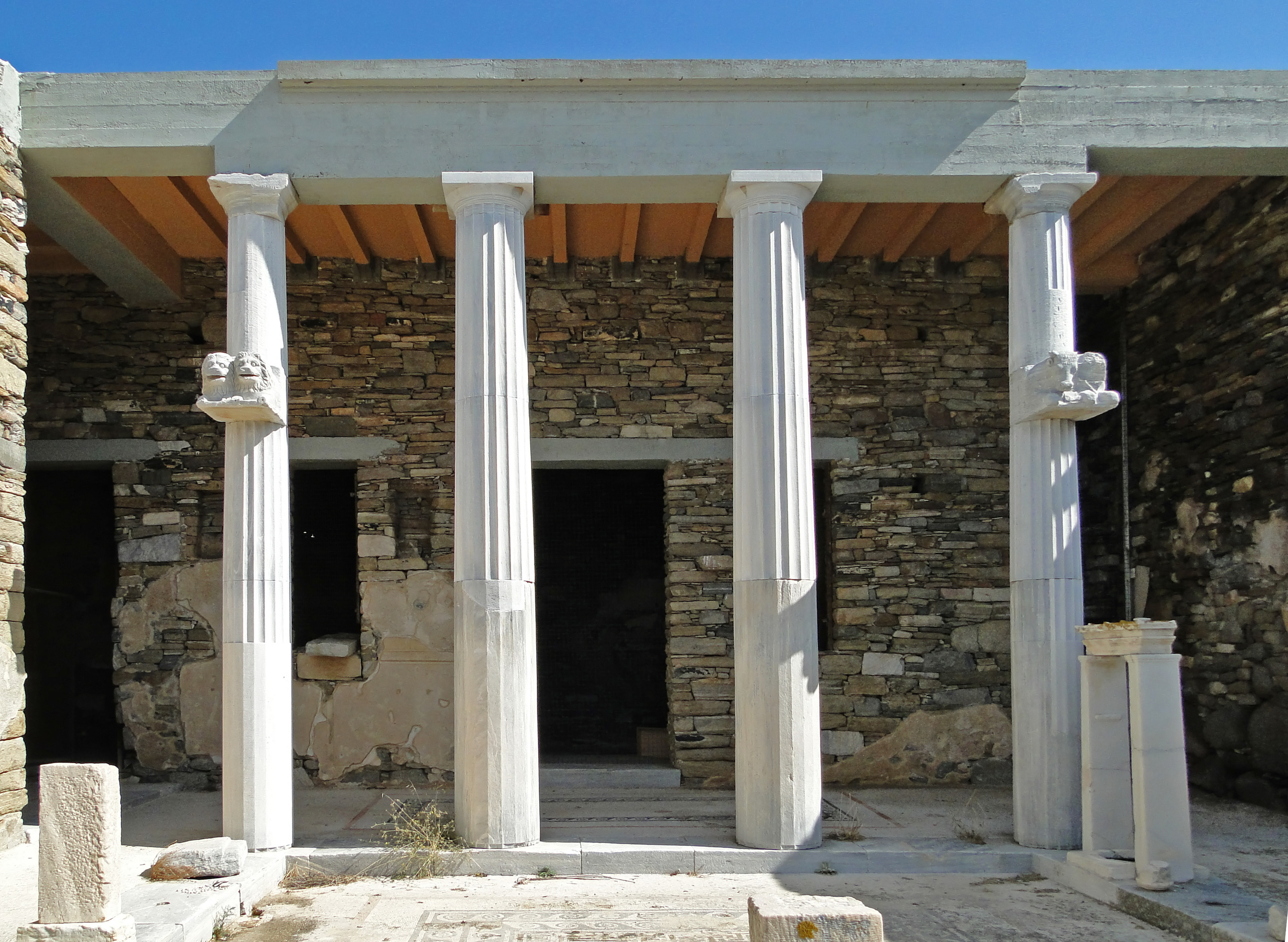
House of the Trident

== See also ==
- Delia (festival)
- Delian problem
- History of the Cyclades
- Asteria

== Further reading and viewing ==
- Reger, Gary (1994) Regionalism and Change in the Economy of Independent Delos. Berkeley, Los Angeles and Oxford: University of California Press.
- Tréheux, Jacques (2023). Études critiques sur les inventaires de l'indépendance délienne. Athènes: École Française d'Athènes. ISBN 9782869585669.
- Vial, Claude (1984) Délos indépendante. Bulletin de correspondance hellénique Supplement X. Athens.
- Vial, Claude (2008) Inscriptions de Délos. Index, tome II: les Déliens (Paris: De Boccard)
- Delos: Island at the Center of the World. Princeton, New Jersey: Films for the Humanities and Sciences, 2006.
