= Agora of the Competaliasts =

Ancient Greek marketplace on the island of Delos, Greece

Coordinates: 37.399°N 25.2663°E

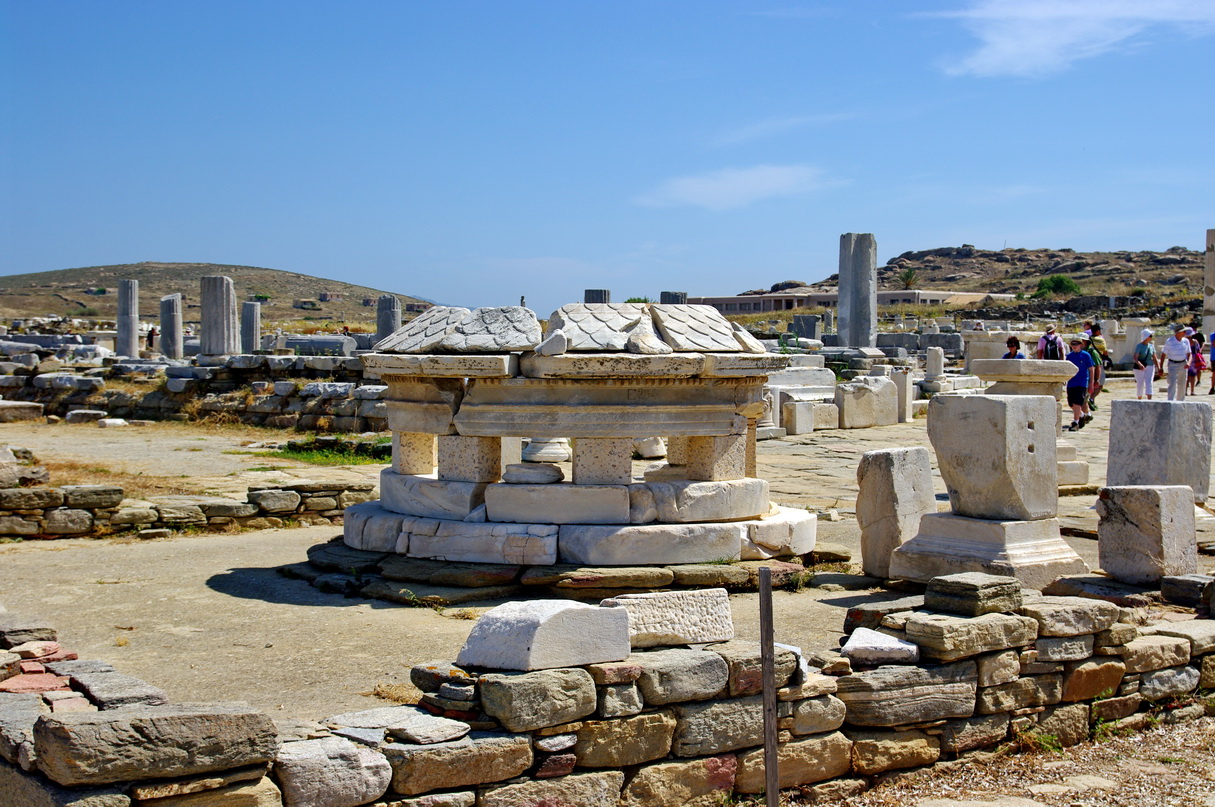
The Agora of the Competaliasts

The Agora of the Competaliasts (Greek: Αγορά των Κομπεταλιαστών) is an ancient Greek archaeological site on the island of Delos, Greece, which dates to the last quarter of the 2nd century BC. It is an agora (public space and commercial center) directly adjacent to the Sacred Harbour. The bases of a square and a round marble monument, both dedicated to Hermes, can be found in the center of the market square. Around these two monuments, one can see the remains of many other monuments erected by merchants, sea captains, and bankers. In the northern portion of this market, one can find the Portico of Philip and an Ionic temple dedicated to Hermes. In the eastern and southern portions are the remains of shops from the golden days of this Hellenic commerce center. The ground is paved with stones of gneiss and there are holes in the stones where tent poles would have gone.
