= Stoibadeion =

Sanctuary of Dionysus on Delos, Greece

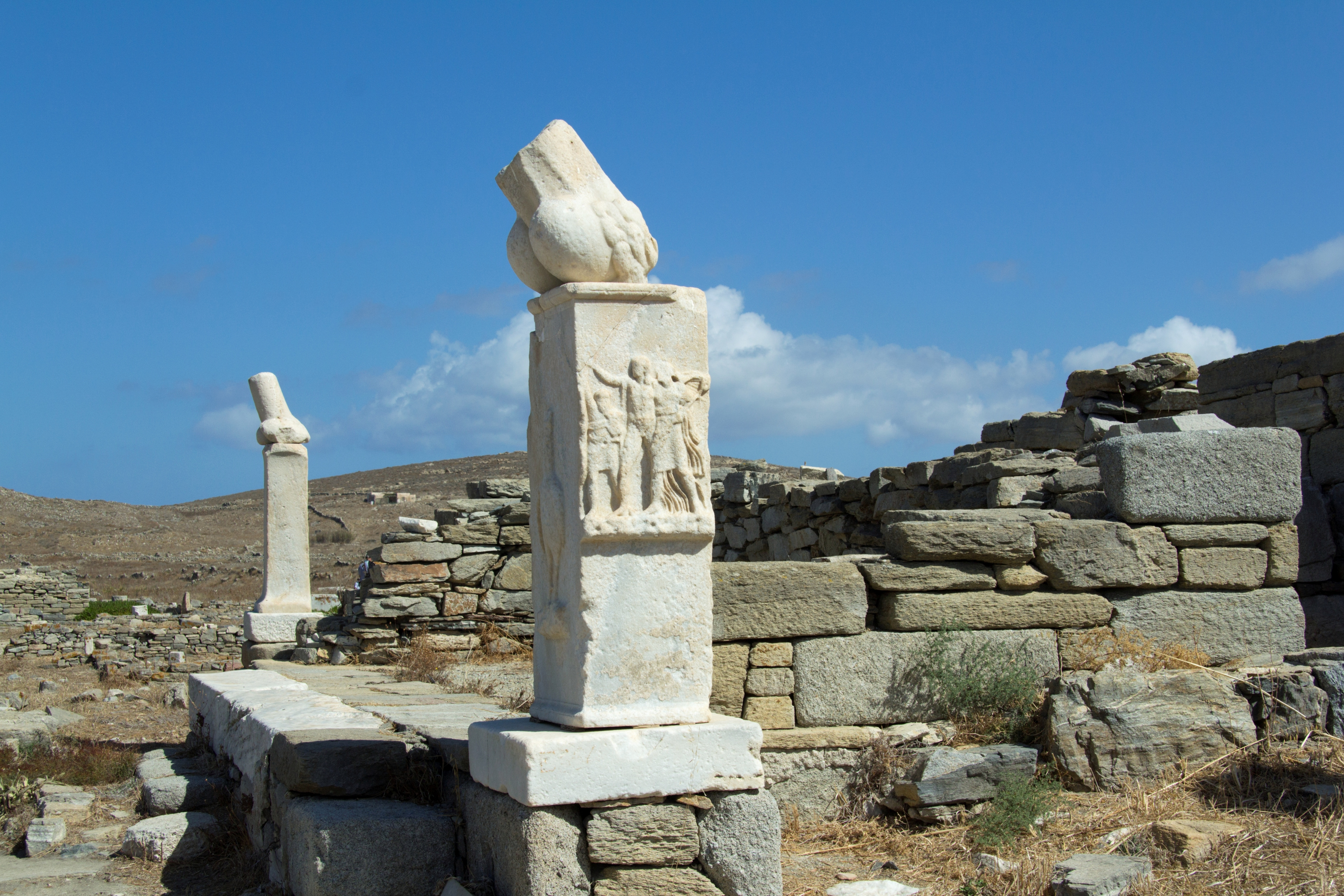

The Stoibadeion (Ancient Greek: Στοιβαδείον, romanized: Stoibadeion) is a temple to Dionysus located on the Greek island of Delos.

== Description ==
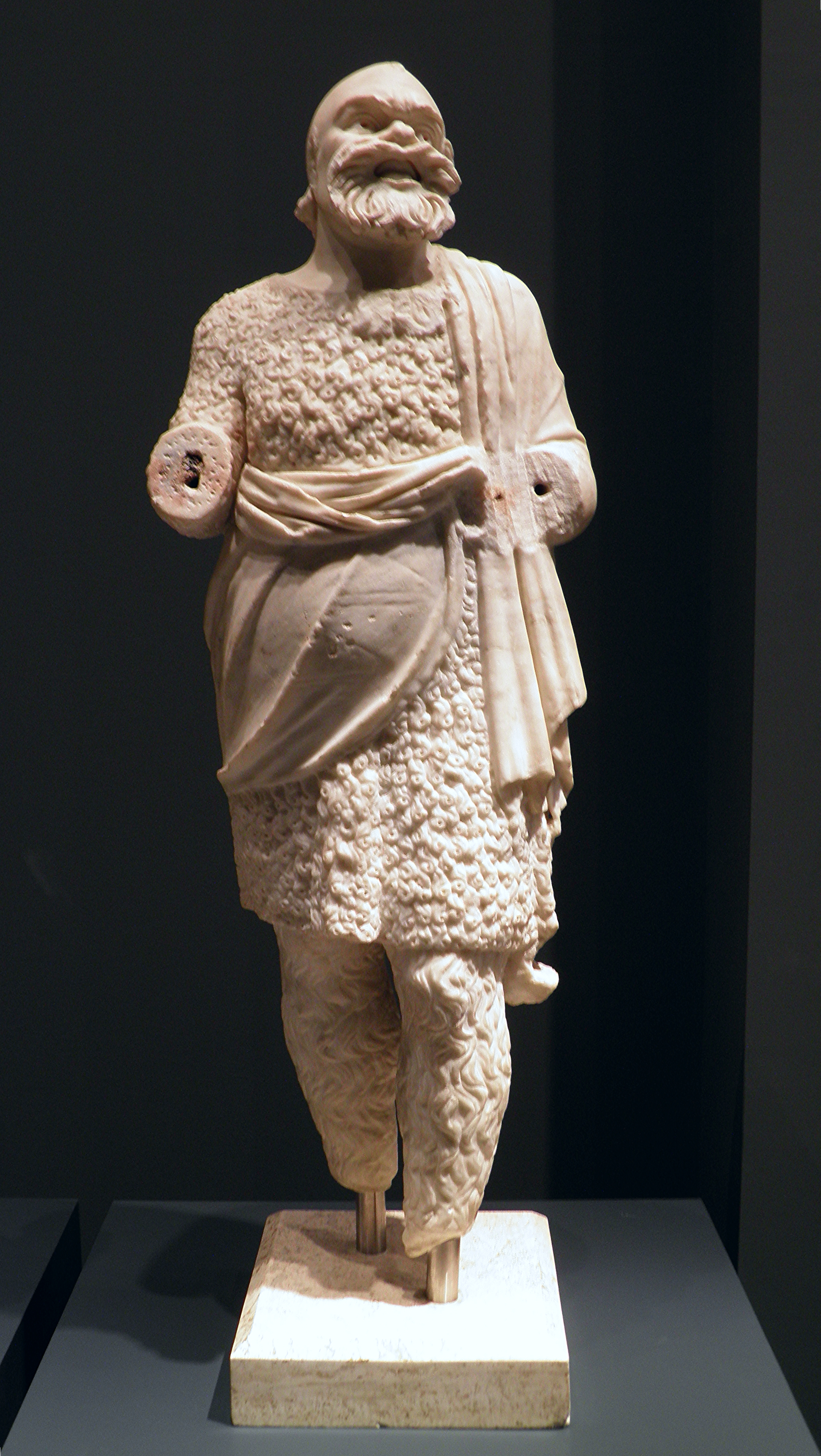
Statue of an actor in the guide of Father Sinelus (Papposilenos) found in Roman villa at Torre Astura

The Stoibadeion contains a rectangular platform containing a statue of Dionysus, which was flanked by two actors impersonating Papposilenoi. These actors are now in the Delos Museum for protection. Two pillars, one on each side of the platform, each once supported a huge phallus, as a symbol of Dionysos. The southern pillar is decorated with relief scenes of a Dionysiac circle. Three sides of the southern pillar have relief representations: the central scene seems to show a peacock with his tail spread, rather than a cockerel whose head and neck are elongated into a phallus as previously thought, on either side are groups containing Dionysus and a Maenad, with a small Silenus on one side and a figure of Pan on the other. The southern pillar bears an inscription that it was erected ca. 300 B.C. by a Delian named Carystios in celebration of a victorious theatrical performance he sponsored.

== See also ==
- List of Ancient Greek temples
- Architecture of Ancient Greece
