= Minoan Fountain =

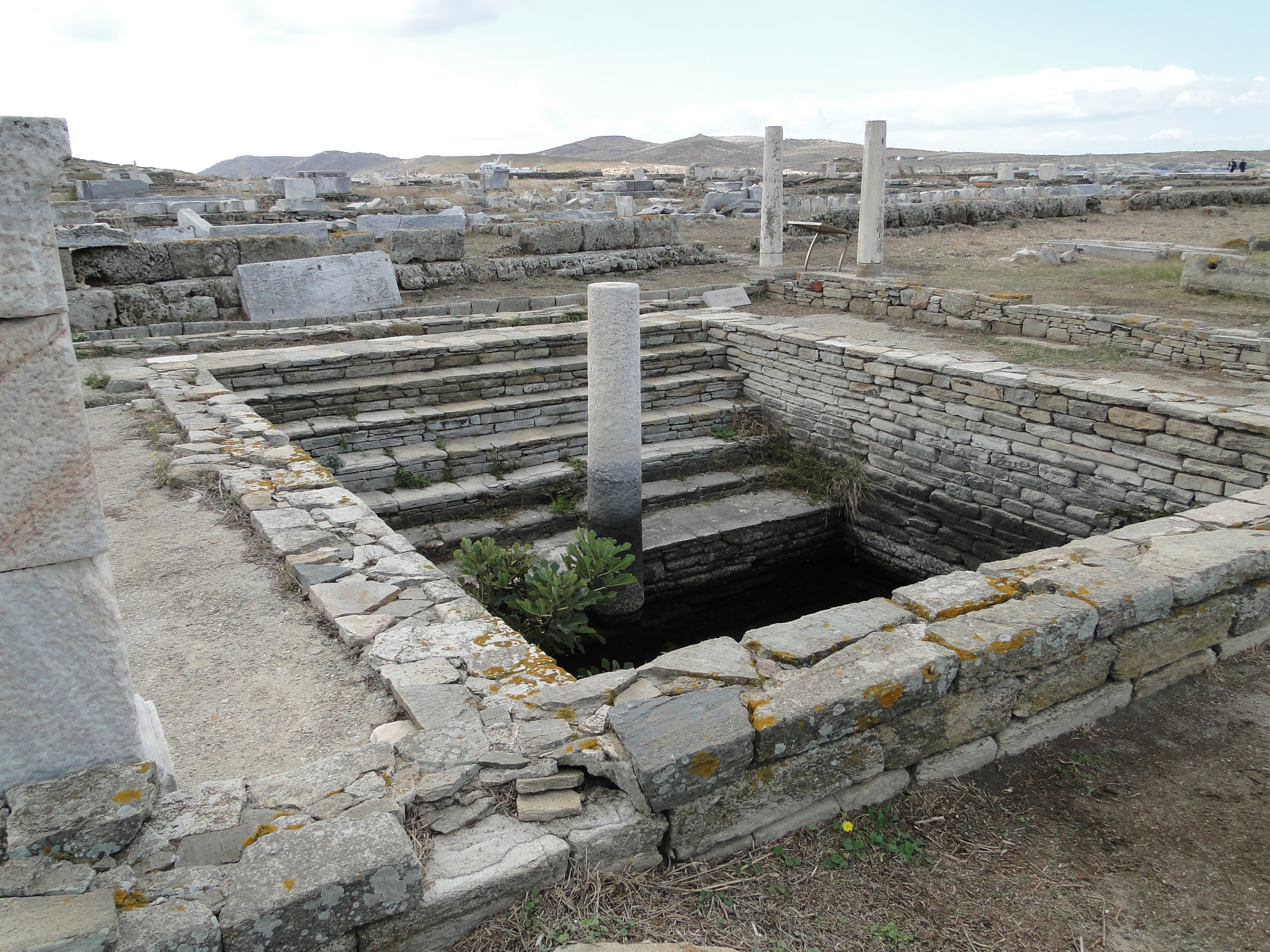
- The Minoan Fountain
- Location: Delos, Greece
- Coordinates: 37.40124°N 25.26792°E

Plan of the Sanctuary of Apollo

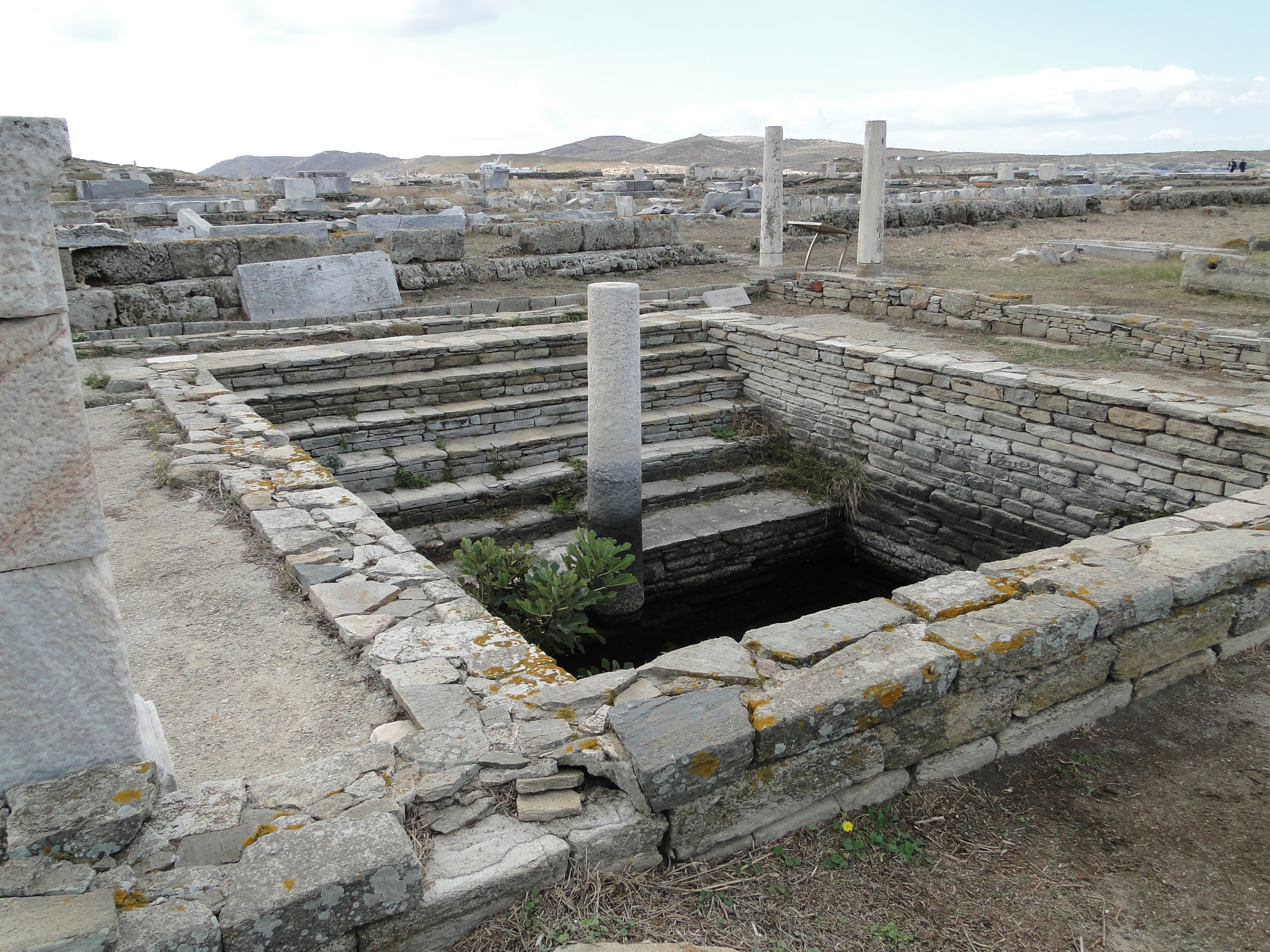
Minoan Fountain in Delos

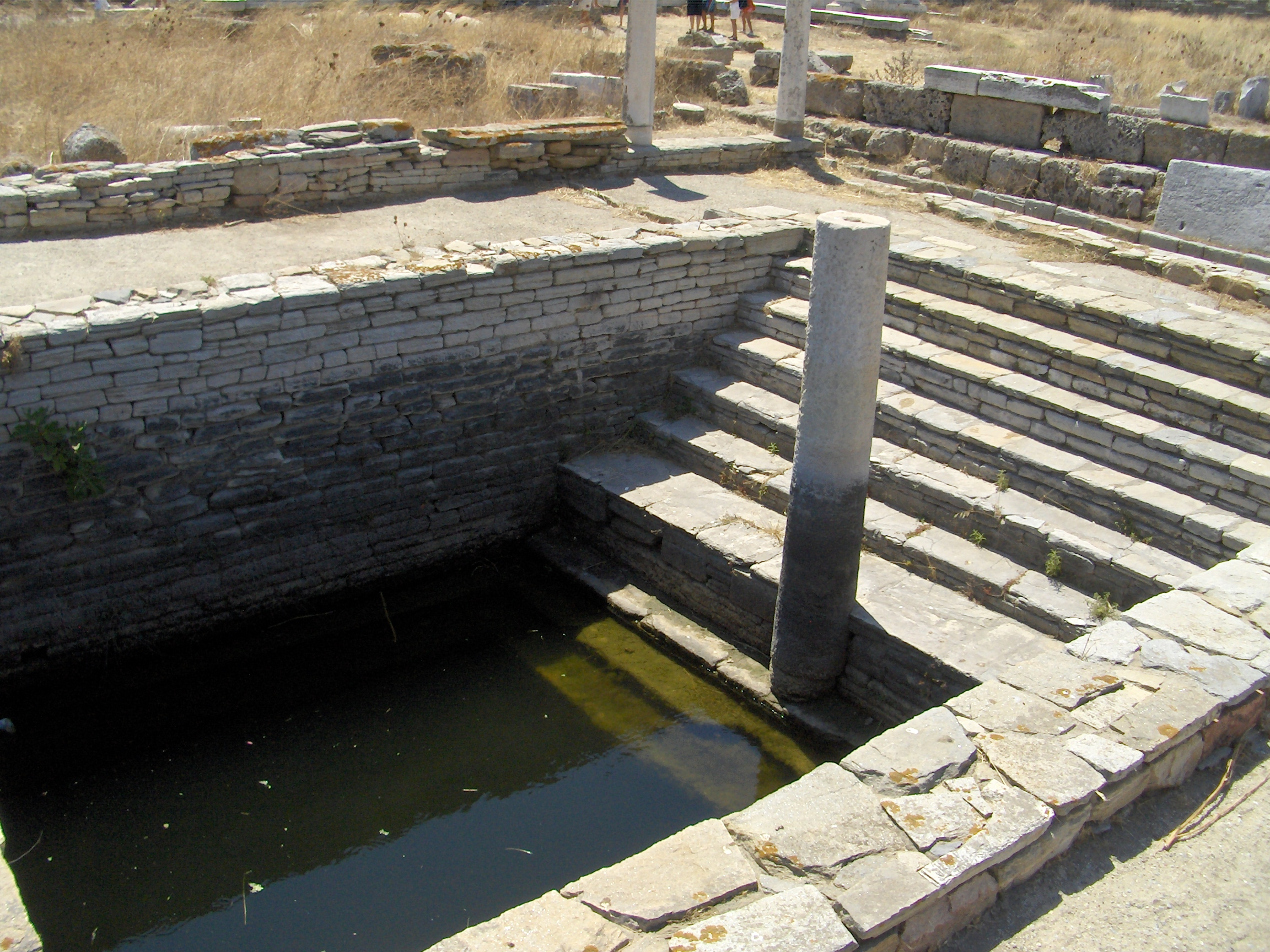
Nine steps led to the water level.

The Minoan Fountain was a monumental public fountain hewn directly from the natural rock. It is located directly behind the Stoa of Antigonos outside the temenos of the Sanctuary of Apollo on the island of Delos. The fountainhouse formalized the use of the sacred spring, and was dedicated to the Cult of the Nymphs.

== Description ==
In the 6th century BC, the fountain was covered by a square building with a hipped roof and walls on three sides. It was built with regular courses of granite and gneiss. A monumental façade on the south side gave access to the fountain through a portico lined with small Doric columns. Nine steps led down to the level of the water. A thin Doric column stood on the third lowest step to further support the roof. The column remains standing, and the spring still fills with water.

== Decoration ==
When repairs were conducted in the mid-2nd century BC, the fountainhouse was decorated with a fresco of a river god with three nymphs. The inscription dedicated the spring to the Minoan Nymphs. An inscribed stele dating to the 5th century regulated use of the public fountain with "no washing, swimming, or throwing of dung into the sacred spring". Transgressors faced a monetary fine.
