= Coroplast (artisan) =

Ancient Greek terracotta modeler

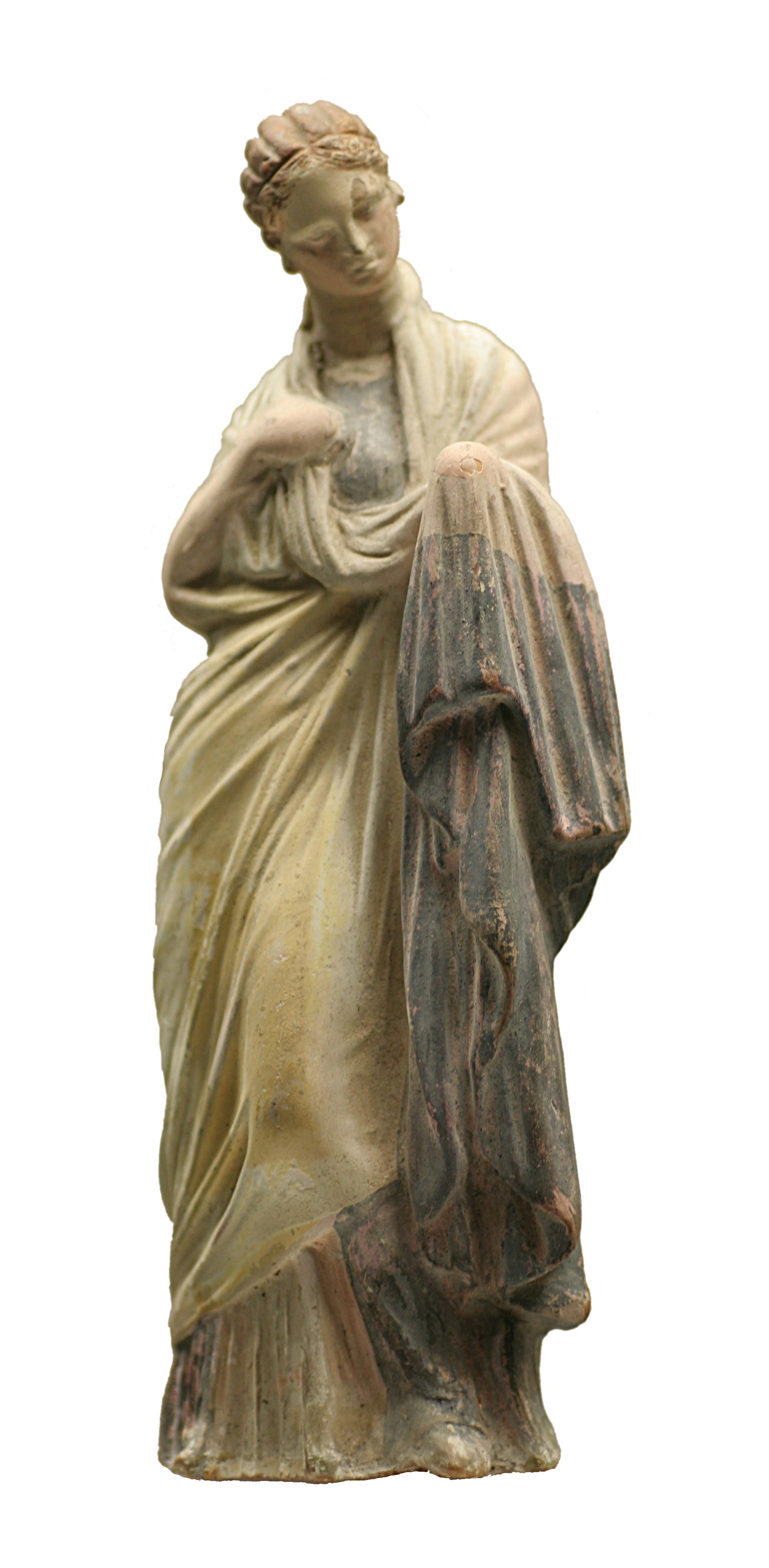
3rd century BCE Greek terracotta figurine

A coroplast (or koroplast) was a modeler of terracotta figurines in Greek antiquity.

Coroplastic studies, the study of ancient terracotta figurines, involves the analysis of the types and sources of clays used, the methods of production employed, the chronology, context, distribution and display of the objects, and their social, political, economic, sacred and historical meaning.

A Coroplast's Dump was located at an archaeological site on the north slope of the Areopagus. Local koroplast workshops existed also in many other Greek centers. Thus, the excavations in Tauric Chersonesos yielded very rich results for this small colony.

== See also ==
- Psi and phi type figurine
