= Psi, phi and tau type figurine =

Greek figurines made of terracotta

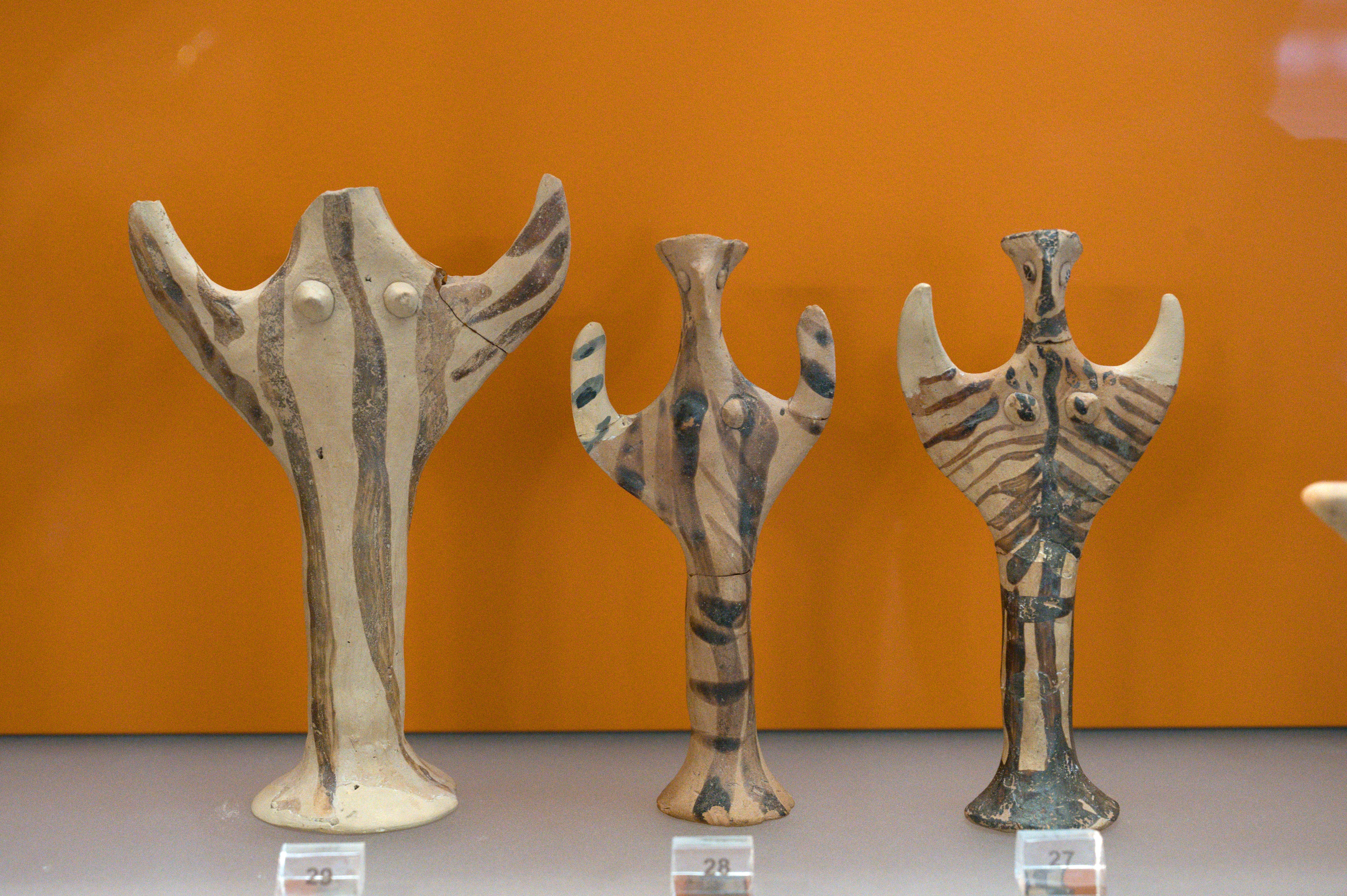
'Psi' type female figurines from the sanctuary of Athena Pronaia, now in the Delphi Archaeological Museum

Psi, phi and tau were types of terracotta figurines made in Mycenaean Greece during the Late Helladic period. They were typically about 10 to 20 centimetres (3.9 to 7.9 in) high and are found in tombs, shrines and settlement areas. They fall into three distinct typologies, each named for the letter of the Greek alphabet that it resembles. The earliest such figures date to the Late Helladic II period (c. 1450 – c. 1400 BCE), and they continued to be made until the end of the Late Helladic III (c. 1050 BCE).

The figurines depict female forms, often wearing a polos headdress that may indicate a goddess or a worshipper. Some, known as the kourotrophos (lit. 'child-rearer') type, include a model of an infant. The function and original meaning of these figures is unclear, and may not have been the same to all Mycenaeans or at all stages in the object's use-life: some are found in clearly sacred or ritual contexts, such as sanctuaries or as offerings in tombs, while others are found in domestic contexts, household rubbish, or used for utilitarian functions such as stopping a vessel or as part of the temper used in mud-brick building.

== Typology ==
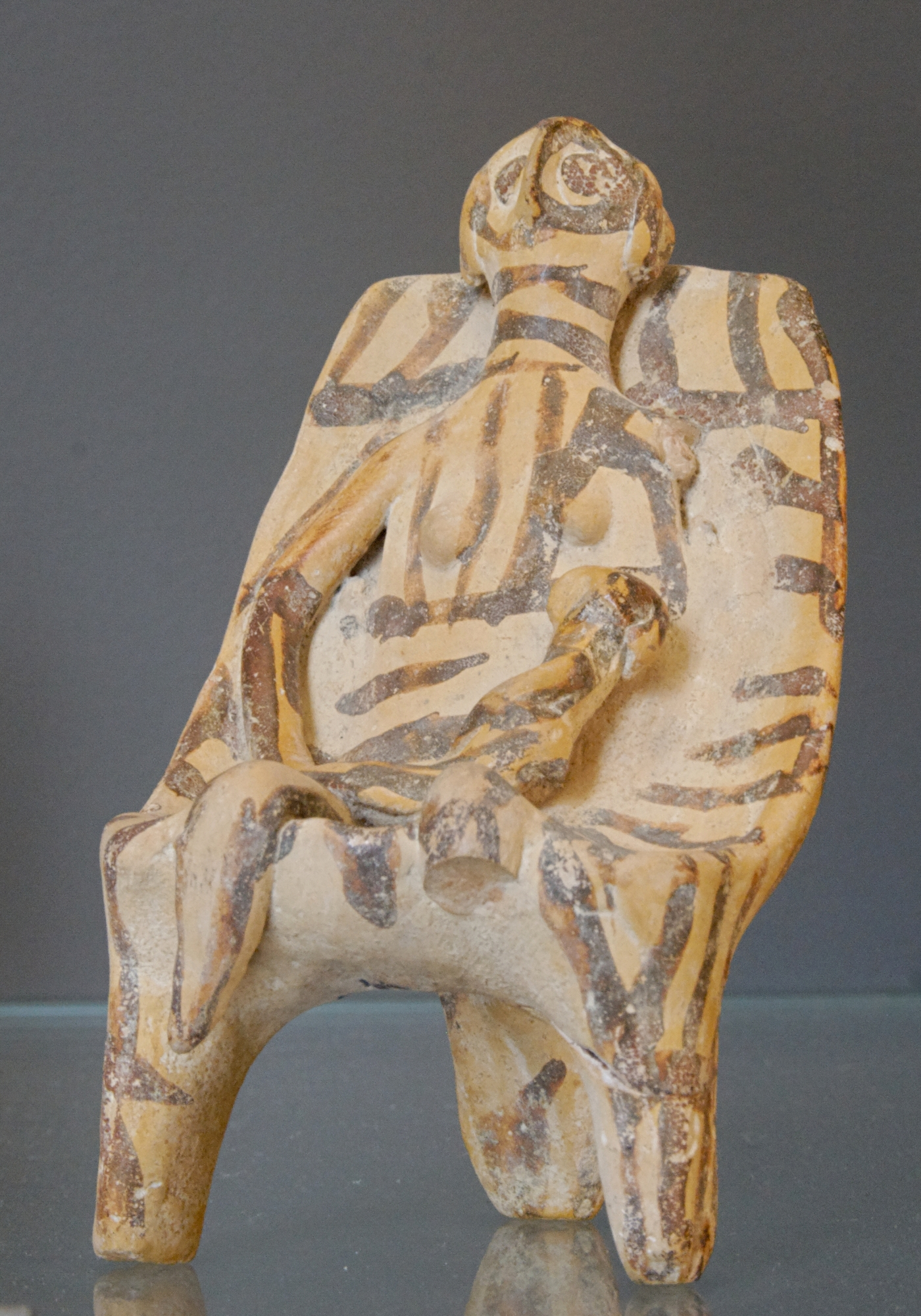
A seated kourotrophos phi-figurine (c. 1360 BCE), now in the Louvre

Figurines of various kinds, both humanoid and animal, were produced throughout the Aegean Bronze Age in a variety of media, including stone, terracotta, and bronze. Psi, phi, and tau figurines are classified by their shape and a resemblance to the Greek letters psi (ψ), phi (Φ) and tau (τ), according to a typological system created by Arne Furumark in 1941. The earliest known figurines of this type were produced in the Late Helladic II period (c. 1450 – c. 1400 BCE), and they were produced in large numbers throughout the Late Helladic III period (c. 1400 – c. 1050 BCE). (Note: Tsonou-Herbst 2010, p. 216. For the dates of the Late Helladic period, see Shelmerdine 2008, p. 4)

Phi, psi, and tau figurines are generally 10 to 20 centimetres (3.9 to 7.9 in) in height, and depict individual female figures. They usually have discernible breasts and are generally painted with wavy lines, which may indicate clothing; this clothing covers the figures' legs. They all have articulated arms: in phi figurines these rest on the hips, while tau figurines hold their elbows out to the side and psi figurines extend their arms over the heads. Phi figurines appear slightly earlier than the other two, but all three were subsequently produced simultaneously. Some examples, known as the kourotrophos (lit. 'child-rearer') type, depict a woman with a child to her breast.

Some figurines appear to wear flattened polos headdresses, which suggests they may depict goddesses or religious worshippers. The figurines appear to have been made by specialist craftspeople by means of a potter's wheel. It is likely that they were made by the same craftspeople who made Mycenaean vases, as similar decorative techniques were employed for both.

== Function ==
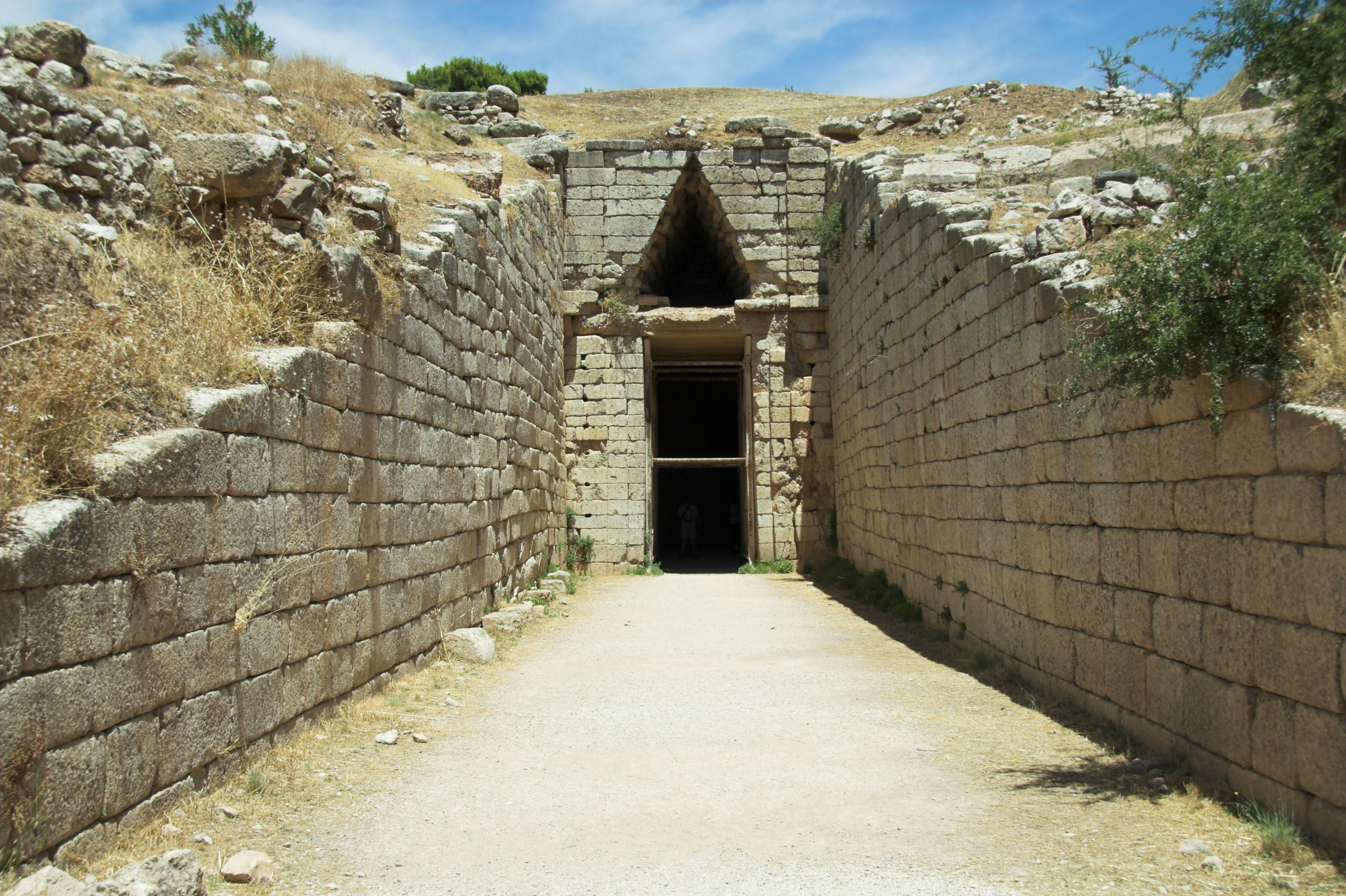
The Tomb of Clytemnestra at Mycenae: Mycenaean figurines were left as offerings outside its walls

The function of psi, phi, and tau figurines is unknown, although it has been suggested that their purpose changed with the context in which they were found. They may have been used as household objects, votives, or grave offerings. They are found in varied contexts: these often include sanctuaries, suggesting a ritual function, but also include storage and cooking areas in domestic space, and in household rubbish-heaps. It is possible that different Mycenaeans held different beliefs about them and that not all considered them sacred, or else that their status changed over the object's use-life. Figurines are sometimes found reused as stoppers for vessels, or mixed into the temper used in mud-brick building.

In contexts dating to the Late Helladic IIIA1 period (c. 1375 – c. 1350 BCE), these figurines are more often found in domestic contents and frequently deposited along with rubbish, and are rarely found in tombs; by contrast, in the LH IIIA2 period (c. 1350 – c. 1300 BCE), they are most often found in funerary contexts. Figurines are also often found in front of the stomion (entranceway) of monumental chamber tombs and tholos tombs, accompanied by kylikes (drinking-vessels) and stirrup jars (used to store wine and perfumed oil). This may suggest that they were used in ceremonies to honour the dead involving libations and ritualised feasting. Similar deposits are also found in front of the walls of major tombs, such as Mycenae's "Great Poros Wall" around the Tomb of Clytemnestra and the "Kyklos" wall near the tholos tombs at Peristeria in Messenia.

Heinrich Schliemann, who discovered examples of these figurines during his nineteenth-century excavations at Mycenae, considered them to represent the classical Greek goddess Hera; Christos Tsountas, who excavated there in the 1880s, agreed that they were goddesses and divided them into types. In the early twentieth century, Martin P. Nilsson suggested that figurines found in different contexts held different meanings, and that those found in graves were intended to act as servants or slaves for the deceased in the afterlife, and perhaps to substitute for male decedents' wives. Figurines are commonly found in children's graves, leading Carl Blegen (who excavated several at Prosymna in the 1930s) to suggest that they represented nurses, or else were children's toys; this is no longer considered a tenable explanation for the whole class, since many are found buried with adults, but may have been true for a subset.

== Gallery ==
Examples of Mycenaean figurines are held by the Goulandris Museum of Cycladic Art (Athens), the British Museum (London), and the Metropolitan Museum of Art in New York.

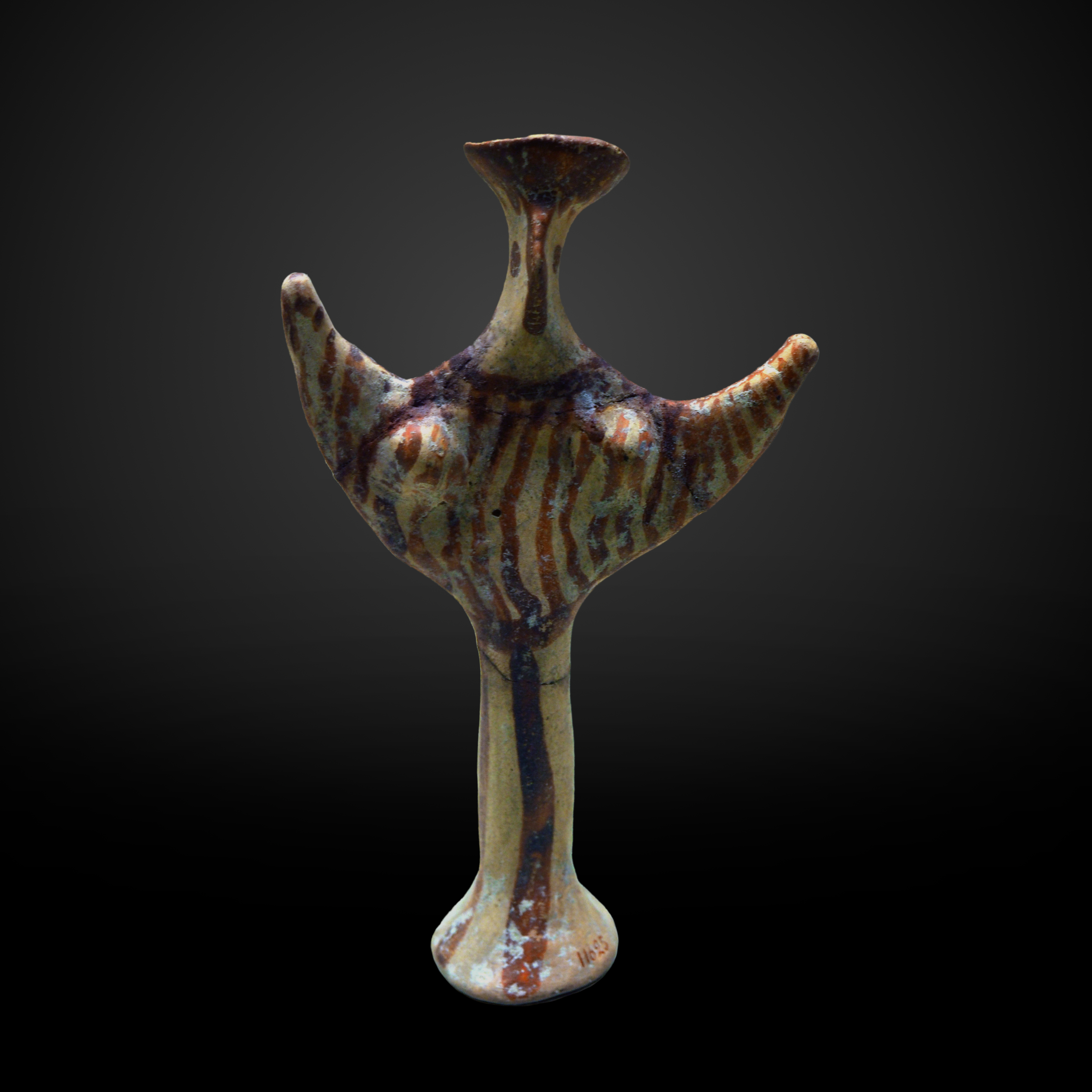
Psi-shaped figurine on display at the Musée d'Art et d'Histoire de Genève

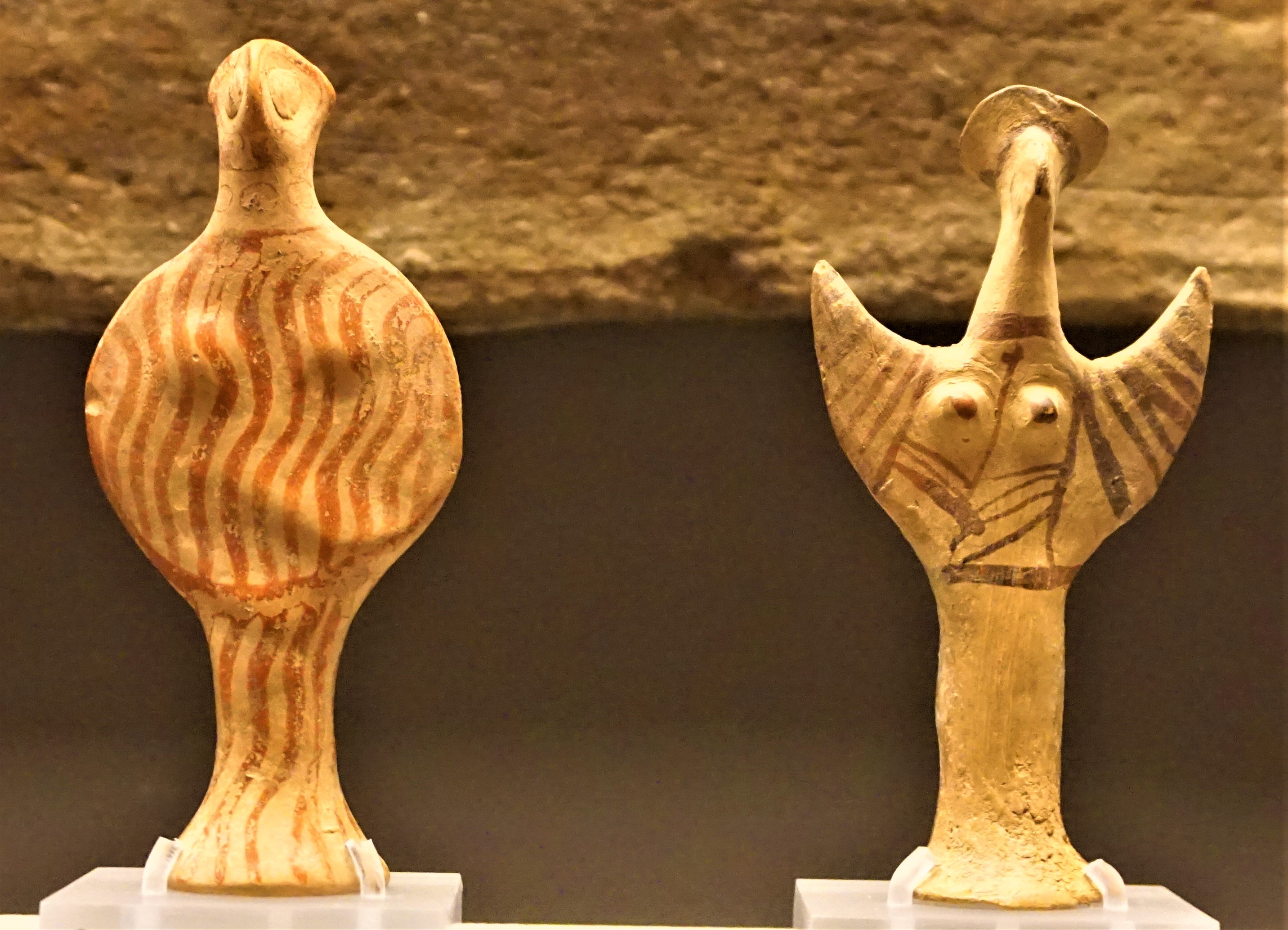
Phi-type and psi-type Mycenaean female figurines; Museum of Cycladic Art, Athens. 14th–12th century BC

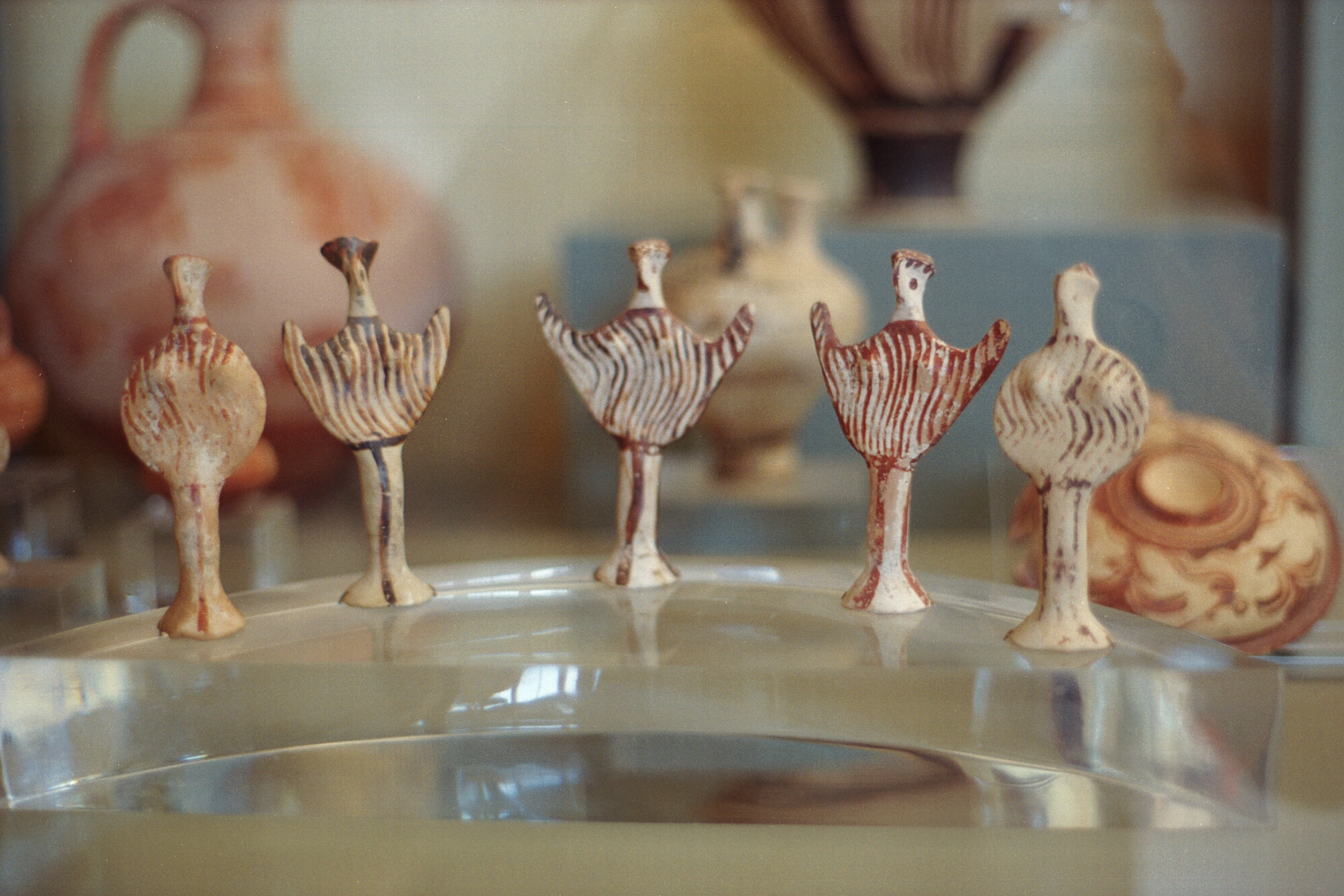
Mycenaean figurines, 14th–13th century BC

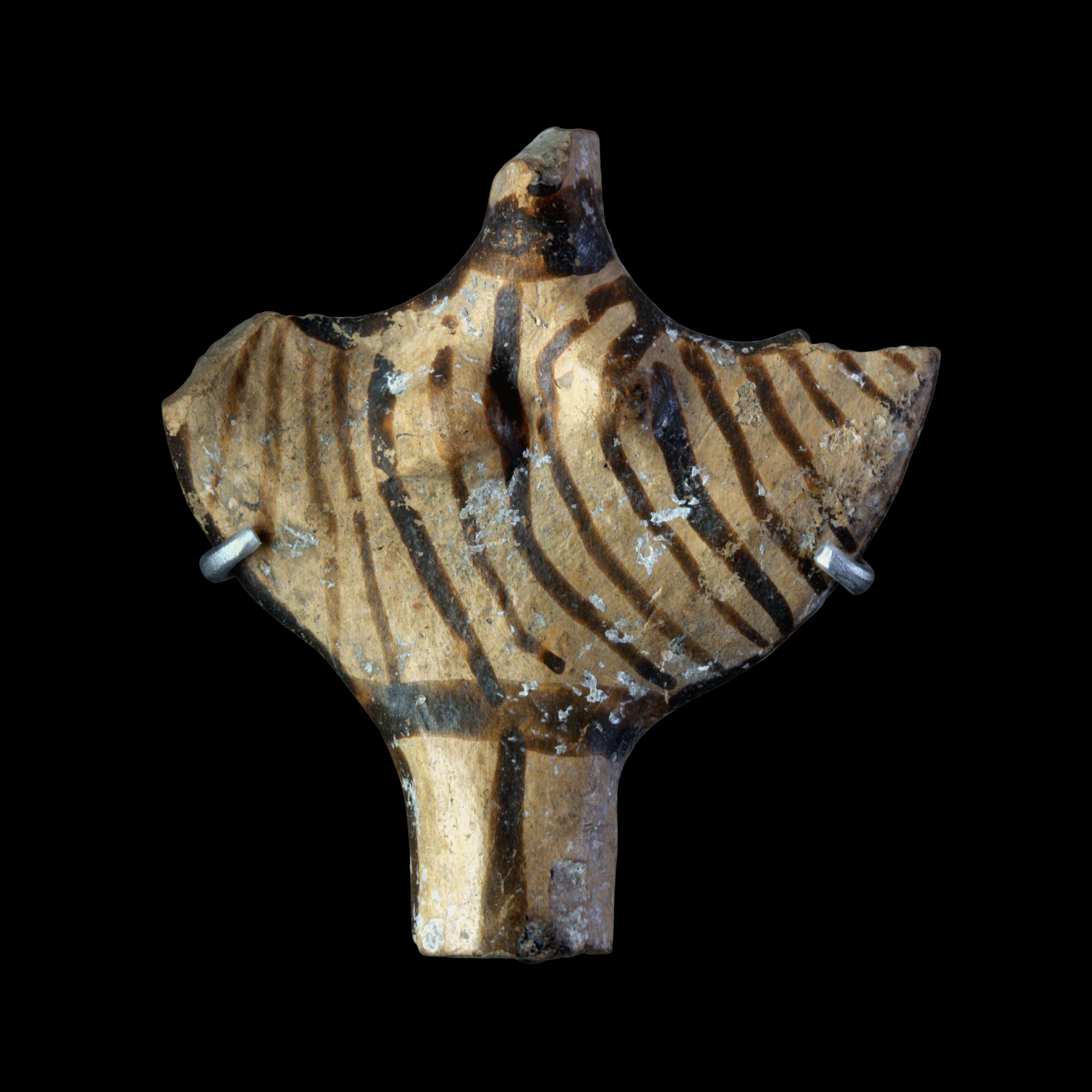
Example of a Psi-shaped figurine of a woman. Mycenaean import found in Ugarit by Claude F. A. Schaeffer and Georges Chenet.

== See also ==
- Mycenaean figurine on tripod

== Bibliography ==
- French, Elizabeth (1971). "The Development of Mycenaean Terracotta Figurines". The Annual of the British School at Athens. 66: 101–187. doi:10.1017/S0068245400019146. JSTOR 30103231. S2CID 194064357.
- Morris, Christine (2017). "Minoan and Mycenaean Figurines". In Insoll, Timothy (ed.). The Oxford Handbook of Prehistoric Figurines. Oxford University Press. pp. 659–680. doi:10.1093/oxfordhb/9780199675616.013.033. ISBN 978-0-19-176791-3.
- Mylonas, George E. (1937). "A Mycenaean Figurine at the University of Illinois". American Journal of Archaeology. 41 (2): 237–247. JSTOR 498413.
- Olsen, Barbara A. (1998). "Women, Children and the Family in the Late Aegean Bronze Age: Differences in Minoan and Mycenaean Constructions of Gender". World Archaeology. 29 (3): 380–392. doi:10.1080/00438243.1998.9980386. JSTOR 125037.
- Shelmerdine, Cynthia (2008). "Introduction: Background, Methods and Sources". In Shelmerdine, Cynthia (ed.). The Cambridge Companion to the Aegean Bronze Age. Cambridge University Press. pp. 1–18.
- Tsonou-Herbst, Ioulia (2010). "Figurines". In Cline, Eric (ed.). The Oxford Handbook of the Bronze Age Aegean. Oxford University Press. pp. 210–222. ISBN 978-0-19-536550-4.
- Van de Moortel, Aleydis (2016). "Politics of Death at Mitrou: Two Prepalatial Elite Tombs in a Landscape of Power" (PDF). In Dakouri-Hild, Anastasia; Boyd, Michael J. (eds.). Staging Death: Funerary Performance, Architecture and Landscape in the Aegean Bronze Age. Berlin: De Gruyter. pp. 89–116. ISBN 978-3-11-047578-4.
