= Standing Youth =

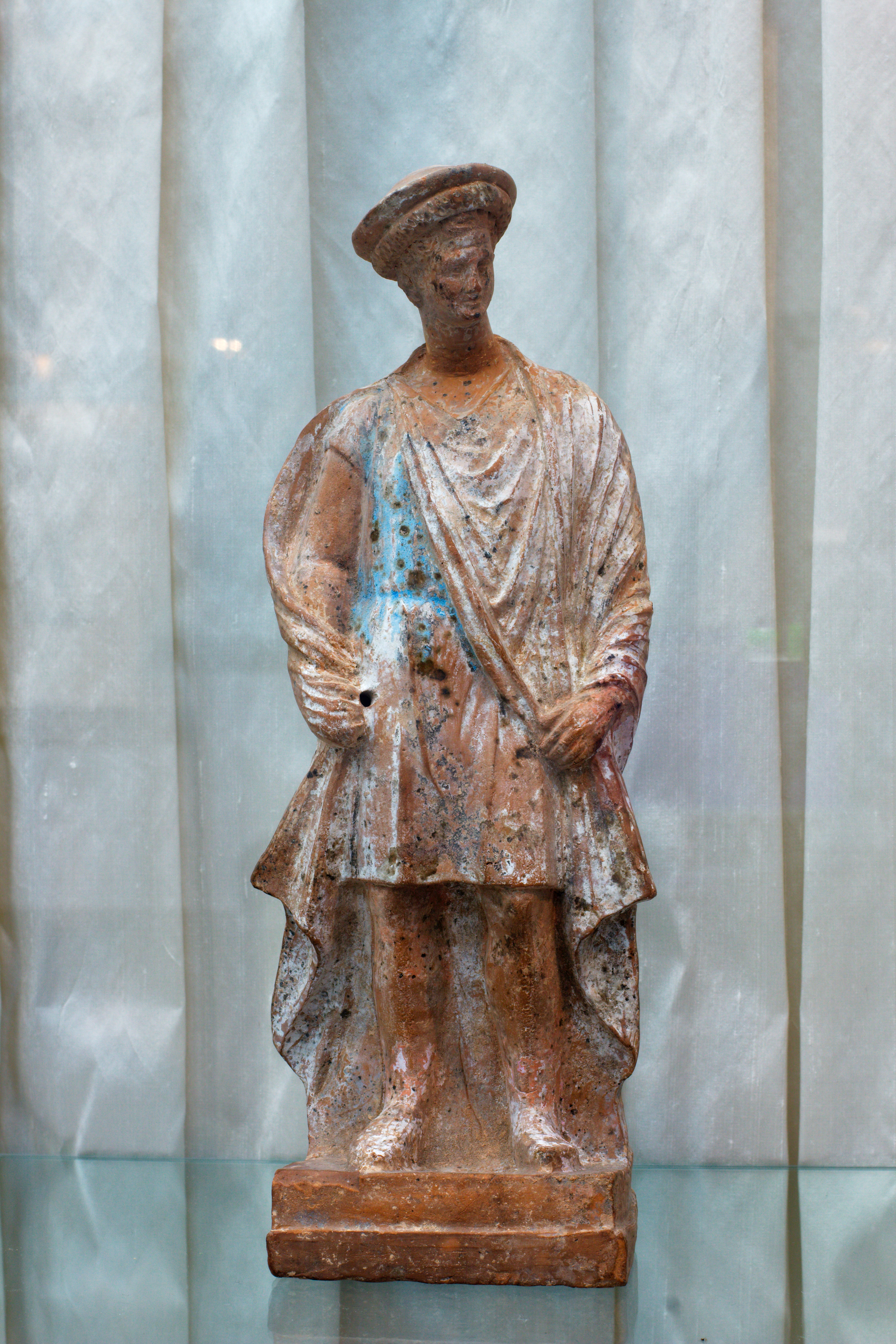
Standing Youth

The Standing Youth is a terracotta Tanagra figurine in the Staatliche Antikensammlungen in Munich with the inventory number SL 162, which was formerly part the collection of James Loeb. The red-brown clay statuette measures 30.7 cm high and was created around 325–300 BC in Boeotia.

The statuette depicts a young man standing on a base of two steps. His head is crowned by a ring of beads and a round hat. He is dressed in a belted chiton and a himation. He grips the draped fabric with both hands. His right hand is lost in this fabric. It probably held a stick, as shown by a round bore hole.

== Bibliography ==
- Johannes Sieveking: Die Terrakotten der Sammlung Loeb. Vol. 2. Buchholz, München 1916, p. 1 (online)
