= Mycenaean figurine on tripod =

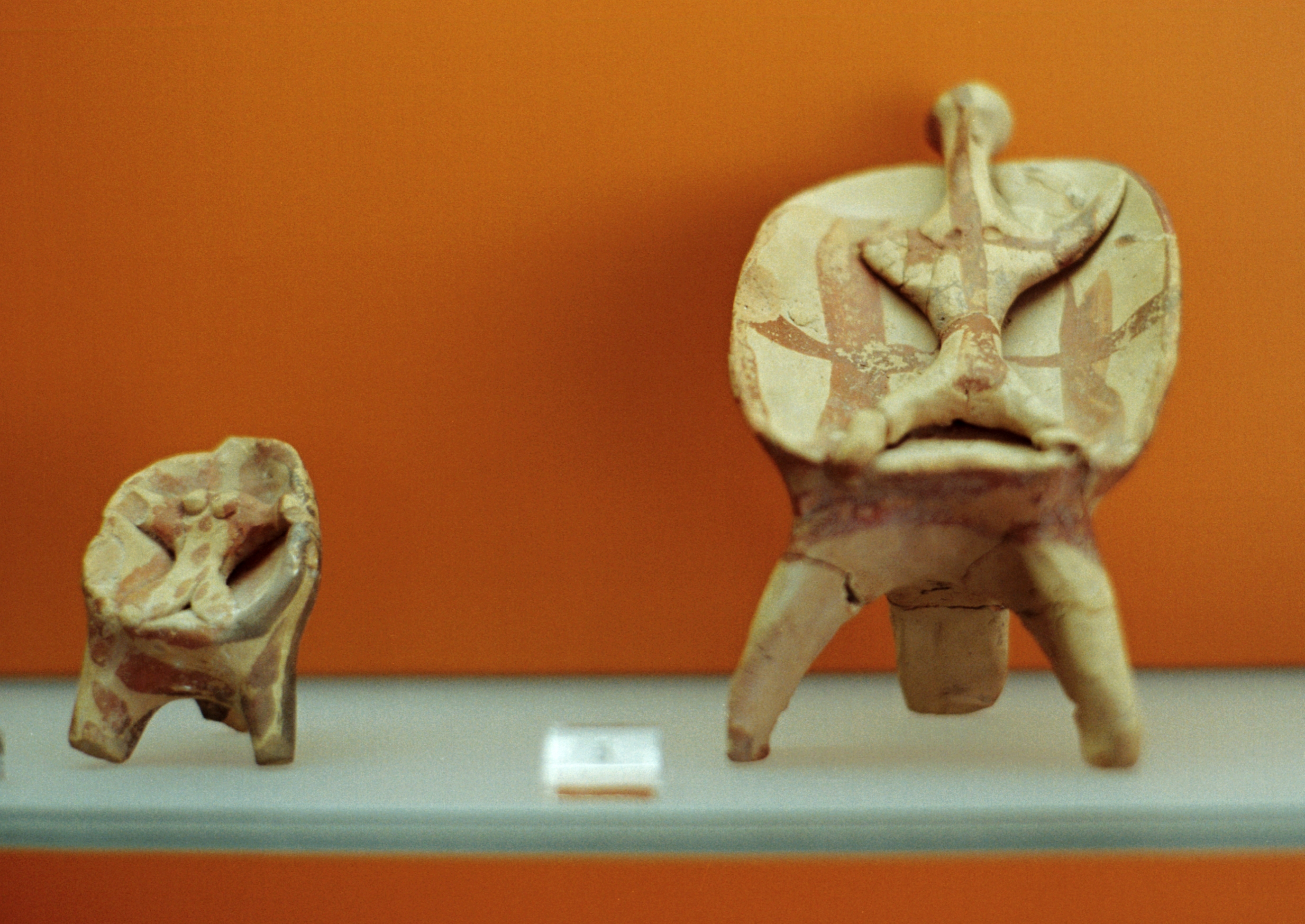

Mycenaean anthropomorphic figurines usually come in three types: Psi, Phi, Tau. However, there are some exceptions, one of which is the curious figure seated on a tripod, originating from Delphi.

== Description ==
In the first room of Delphi Archaeological Museum is exhibited a clay figurine of the Mycenaean period, depicting a figure seated on what seems to be a tripodic chair. It was discovered in the region of the sanctuary of Athena Pronaia. It is a particularly rare object, as the majority of Mycenaean figurines belong to the types Φ (phi) and Ψ (psi).

The figurine has aroused the interest of scholars, as it has been considered to constitute a precursor of Pythia seated on a tripod. The theory has not been proved, as it is still believed that the cult of Apollo had not been yet established in the Mycenaean period with the same ritual as later. The figurine is decorated with linear motifs in red paint.
