= Tanagra figurine =

Ancient Greek terracotta statuette

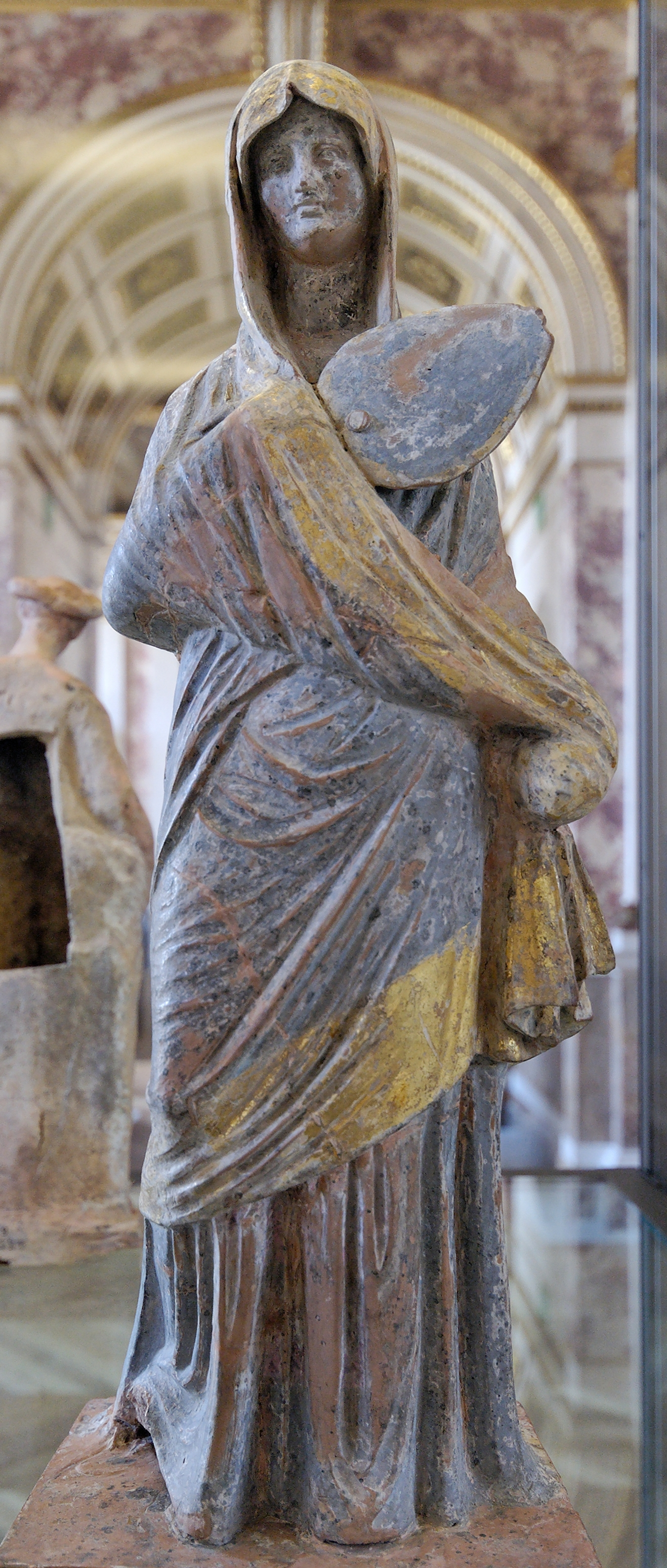
"Lady in blue", molded and gilded terracotta figurine, Louvre, Paris

The Tanagra figurines are a mold-cast type of Greek terracotta figurines produced from the later fourth century BC, named after the Boeotian town of Tanagra, where many were excavated and which has given its name to the whole class. However, they were produced in many cities. They were coated with a liquid white slip before firing and were sometimes painted afterward in naturalistic tints with watercolors, such as the famous "Dame en Bleu" ("Lady in Blue") at the Louvre. They were widely exported around the ancient Greek world. Such figures were made in many other Mediterranean sites, including Alexandria, Tarentum in Magna Graecia, Centuripe in Sicily and Myrina in Mysia.

Although not portraits, Tanagra figures depict real women—and some men and boys—in elegant but everyday costume, with familiar accessories like hats, wreaths or fans. Some character pieces may have represented stock figures from the New Comedy of Menander and other writers. Others continued an earlier tradition of molded terracotta figures used as cult images or votive objects. Typically they are about 10 to 20 centimetres high.

Some Tanagra figurines were religious in purpose, but most seem to have been entirely decorative, much like their modern equivalents in porcelain from the 18th century onward. Given Greek burial customs, they were placed as grave goods in the tombs of their owners, very likely without any sense that they would serve the deceased in the afterlife, in the way that is common in the funerary art of ancient Egypt or China. They do not seem to have been specially made for burial.

The coraplasters, or sculptors of the models that provided the molds, delighted in revealing the body under the folds of a himation thrown round the shoulders like a cloak and covering the head, over a chiton, and the movements of such drapery in action.

== Discovery and excavation ==
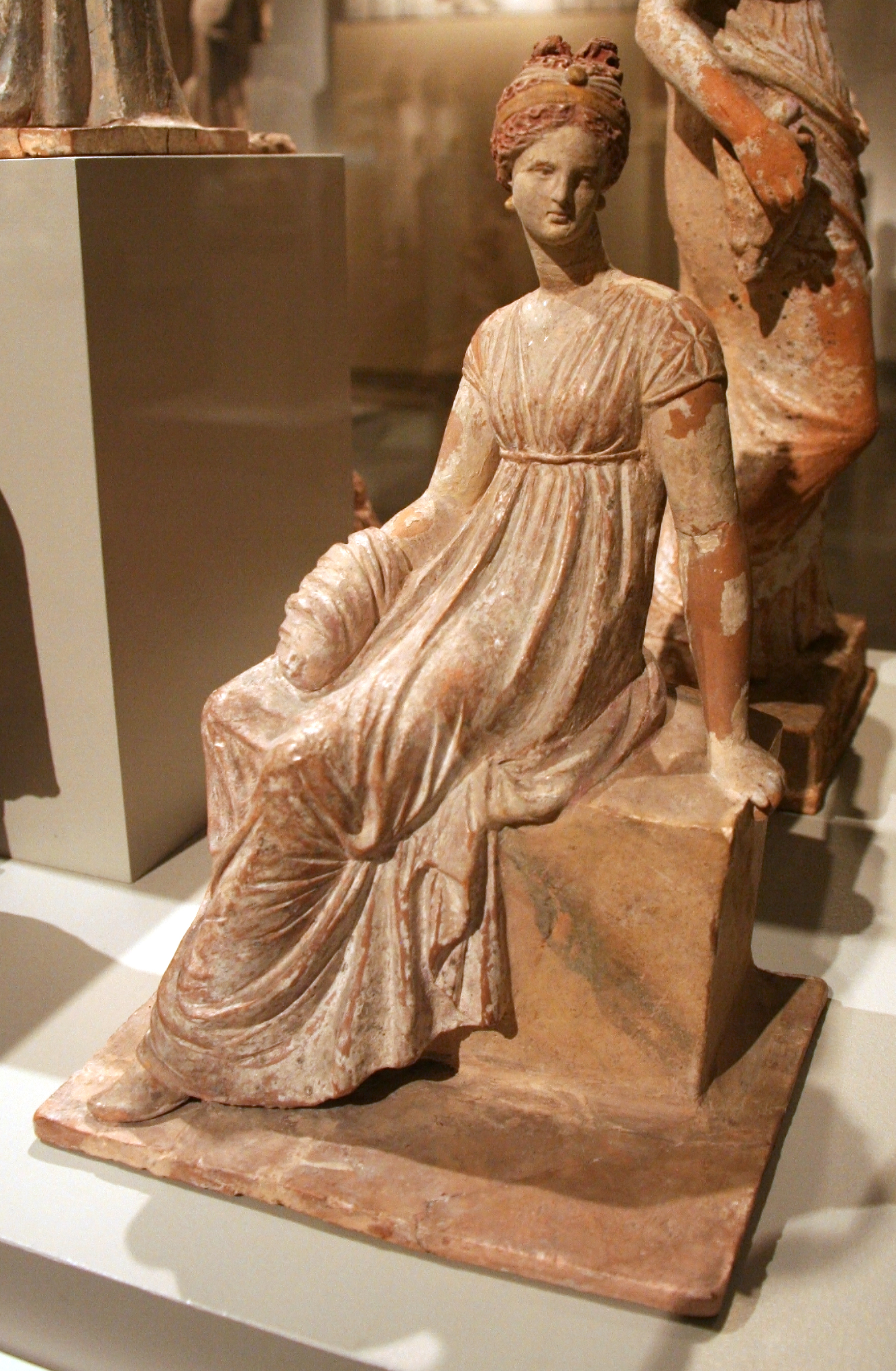
Tanagra figurine representing woman sitting

Tanagra was an unimportant city in antiquity. The city had come to the attention of historians and archeologists during the early 19th century after war broke out between the Turks and their allies, the British and the French, following a warning of a French invasion. Tanagra figures had not been much noted before the end of the 1860s, when ploughmen of Vratsi in Boeotia, Greece, began to uncover tombs ranging in date over many centuries. The main finds especially from the 4th and 3rd centuries BC were secured in 1874. Inside and outside the tombs of the Hellenistic period—3rd to 1st centuries BC—were many small terracotta figures. Great quantities found in excavation sites at Tanagra identified the city as the source of these figures, which were also exported to distant markets.

The figures appealed to 19th century middle-class ideals of realism, and "Tanagra figures" entered the visual repertory of Europeans. Jean-Léon Gérôme created a polychromatic sculpture depicting the spirit of Tanagra, and one French critic described the fashionable women portrayed in the statuettes as "the parisienne of the ancient world".

Under the pressure of collectors' demands in the late 19th century, Tanagra terracottas began to be faked.

== Figurines ==
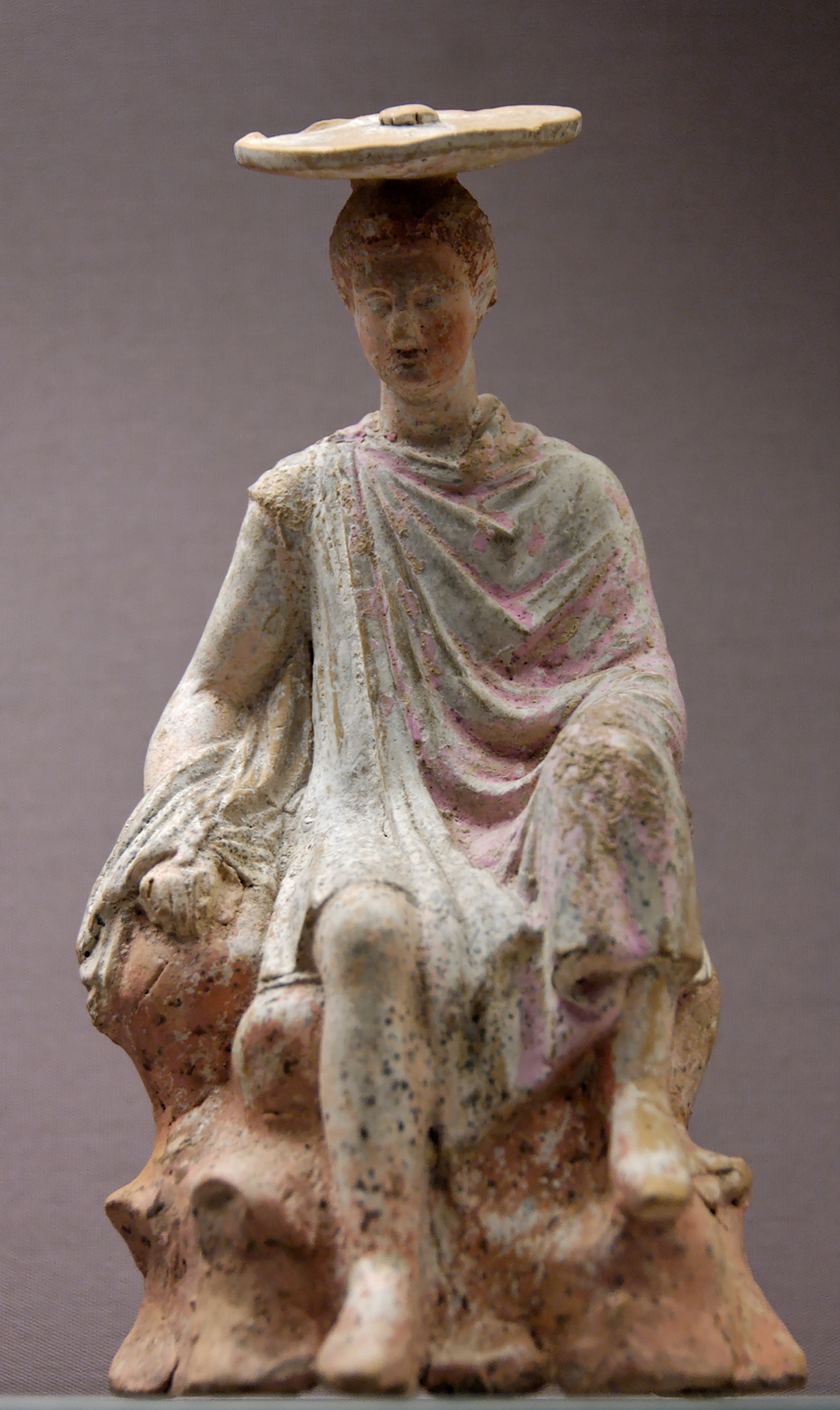
Young boy seated on a rock, ca 300 BC

=== Purpose ===
The figures were posed in various ways to correspond to the life of the deceased. The figurines that were buried in the graves led to a theory that the small figures represented the person's possessions. They were believed by historians to bring comfort to the dead, sending them to the next world in peace as they took something from their old lives with them. It is speculated that though it was usual to place the figurines in the graves, it was not essential, as a vase would have been.

=== Subject matter ===
These figurines represented moments in everyday life, such as a woman taking care of her children, or a child playing, as well as men and young children sitting and women playing games with other women or by themselves.

- Seated women and girls
- Women leaning against a column
- Crouching woman
- Pickaback
- Men and young men
- Eros
- Aphrodite
- Grotesques

A Standing Youth in Munich is a less common example of a decorative fashion figure of a man. The piece in Boston now called Polyphemos reclining and holding a drinking bowl combines religion and satire, as it was found at a sanctuary that held an annual festival where dramatic versions of mythological stories were performed.

== Campaigns of excavation ==
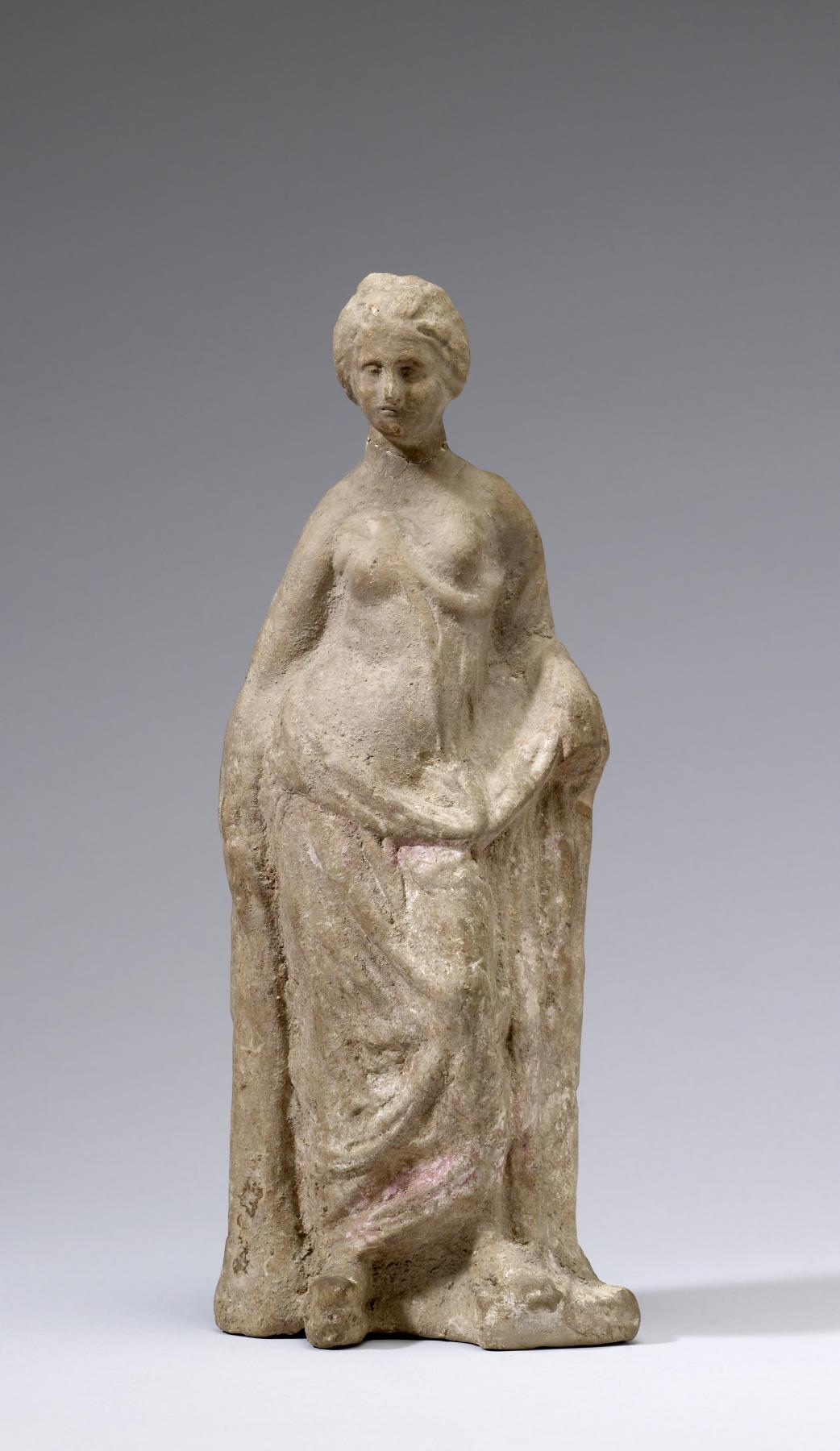
This terracotta figurine of a woman demonstrates some thematic elements that are common to these statuettes, Walters Art Museum, Baltimore

=== Initial excavations ===
In 1806, Col. W.M. Leake visited the city of Tanagra and described the ruins that he had seen in detail in Travels in Northern Greece. Cambridge scholar Christopher Wordsworth visited the city in 1832, and in 1837, H.M. Ulrichs, a German scholar, visited the site. During 1852 the French General Staff published the initial map that revealed the location of the first six graves found in the ruins.

=== Grave robberies ===
In 1870, an outbreak of grave robberies had occurred in the ruins of the city of Tanagra. This resulted in many of the tombs being ruined due to the robbers' carelessness in excavating the graves in order to steal the Tanagra figurines. Many of the graves had vases placed on them, but the majority of them ended up broken. During 1873, a number of illegal permits had been confiscated from people in nearby villages which would have allowed them to excavate the graves. This led the Archeological Society of Athens to protect the site and begin excavation before anything else could be stolen or destroyed.

=== Excavation of 1874–1879 ===
The Archeological Society of Athens sent Panagiotis Stamatakis, a senior official, to excavate the graves that had been left intact. Before he began, he confiscated antiquities from people in nearby villages. The grave robberies had led historians to excavate the city to learn more of its culture and history, and also to discover why the figurines were mainly found in graves, and what they might have represented for the deceased. The excavations would be on and off because of the possibility of damaging any art that might be left in the intact sites. Most of the Tanagra figurines were discovered to be buried with the dead. From the excavations a large number of figurines had been found among the ruins, but no details of the exact number of figurines were released. Many were missing or had been given away. While Stamatakis and the others sent from the Archeological Society of Athens would dig during the day, the people living near the ruins would dig during the night due to the lack of guards.

== In Media ==
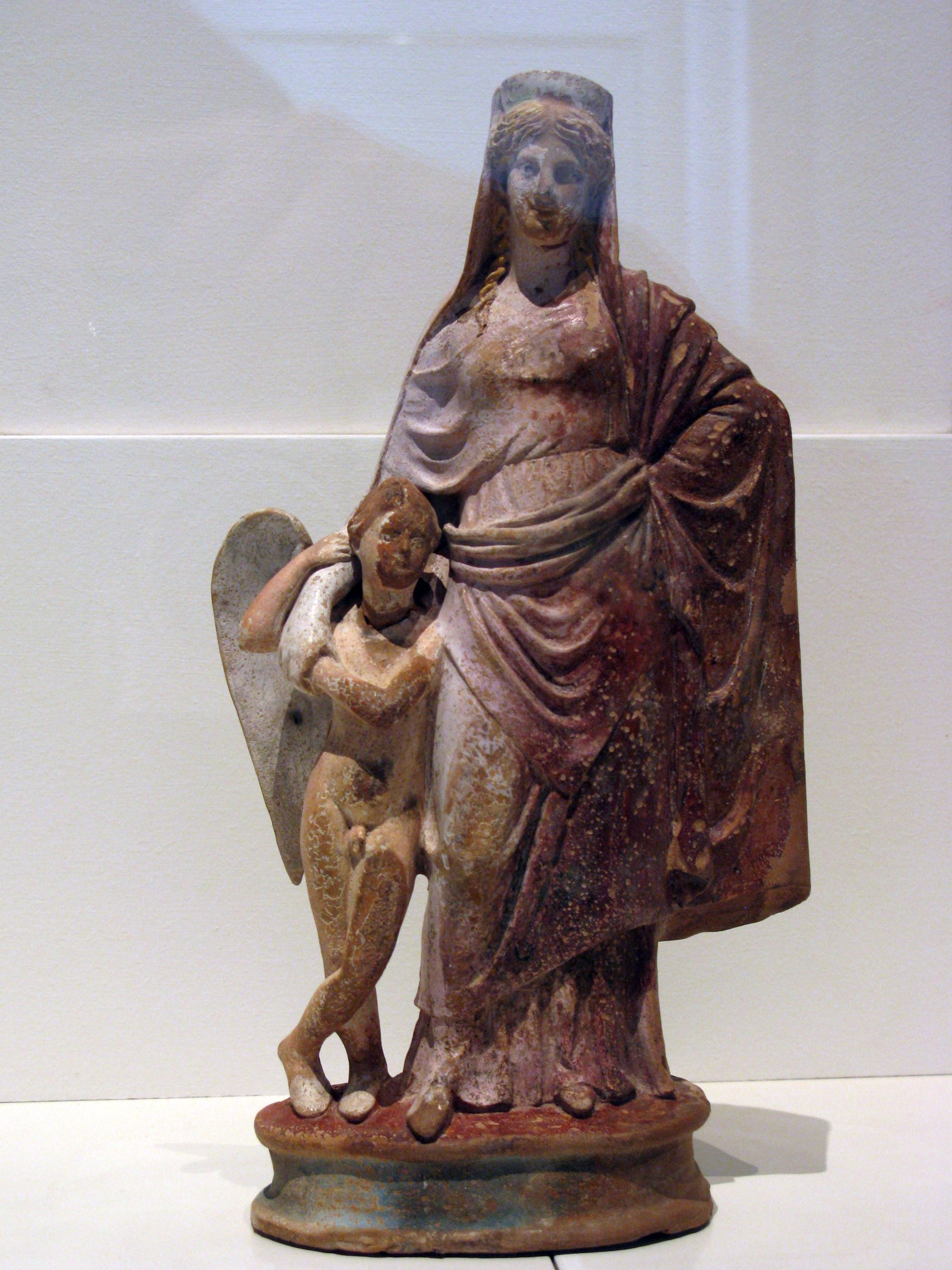
Figurine of Aphrodite and Eros, 4th-century BC, National Archaeological Museum of Greece.

Oscar Wilde, in his novel The Picture of Dorian Gray (1891), has Dorian liken his love, Sybil, to "the delicate grace of the Tanagra figurine that you have in your Studio, Basil." Later, in his play An Ideal Husband (1895), Wilde introduces the character of Mabel Chiltern upon her entrance by stating (amongst further description), "she is really like a Tanagra statuette, and would be rather annoyed if she were told so."

The French author Paul Bourget was a collector of Tanagra figurines. He uses them as a metaphor in his novel The Disciple (1901).

The actress Mary Anderson when playing Galatea in Pygmalion and Galatea was originally going to wear a costume based on the draped Tanagra figurines. However the idea was vetoed as it would have obscured Anderson's face from the audience.
