= Greek terracotta figurines =

Ancient Greek pottery figures

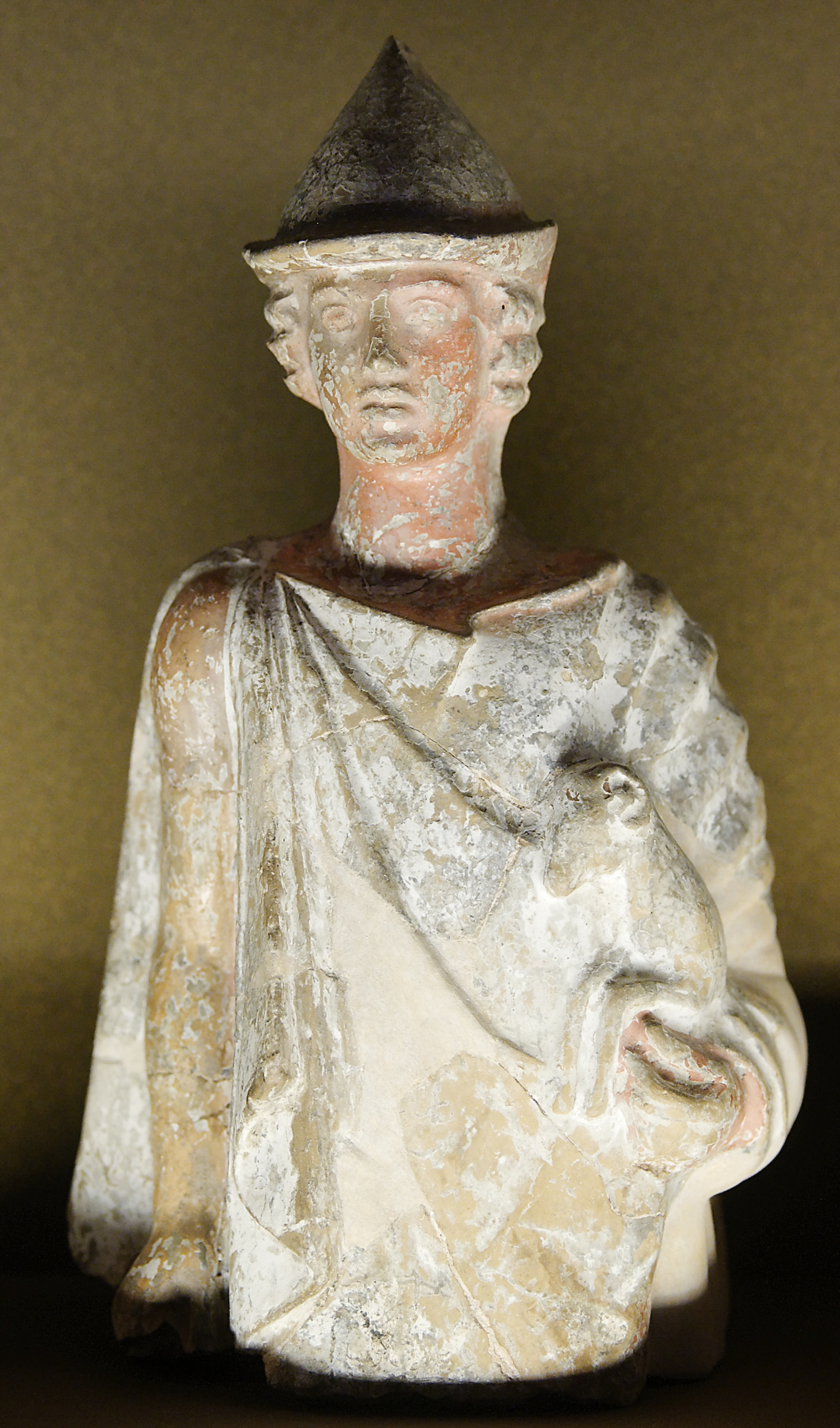
Hermes criophorus (?), Boeotian terracotta figurine, ca. 450 BC, Louvre

Terracotta figurines are a wide range of small figurines made throughout the time span of Ancient Greece, and one of the main types of Ancient Greek pottery. Early figures are typically religious, modelled by hand, and often found in large numbers at religious sites, left as votive offerings. Psi and phi type figurines are two very early and simple types, dating as far back as 1400 BCE.

By the Hellenistic period, as well as a continuing production of religious figures, there was a near-industrial mass-production of sophisticated decorative figures, many of fashionably dressed women, which were often painted. These are the so-called Tanagra figurines, though Tanagra was only one centre of production. Figurines provide an invaluable testimony to the everyday life and religion of the ancient Greeks.

== Techniques of manufacture ==
=== Modelling ===
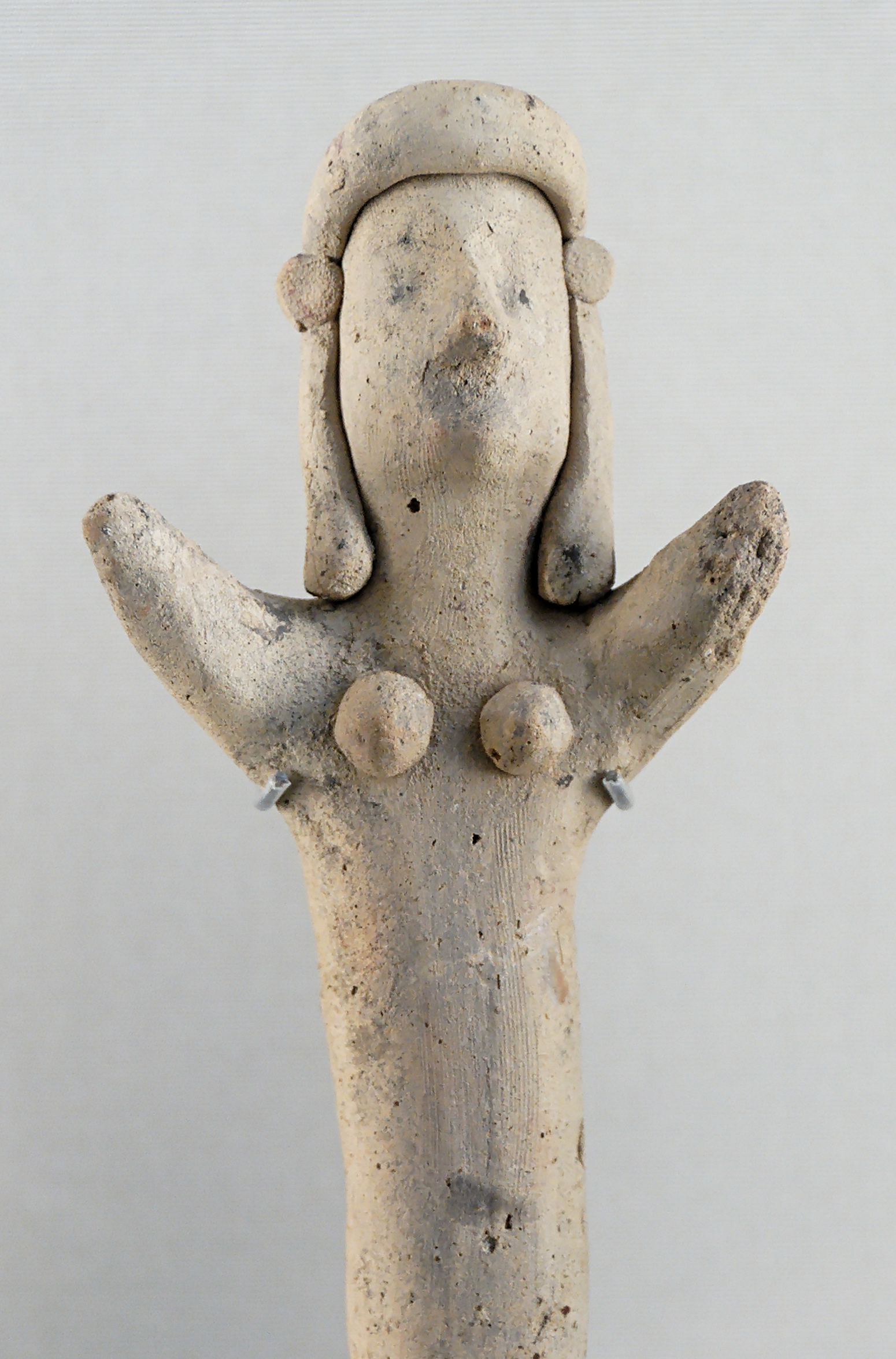
Woman with raised arms, typical funerary offering, Cyprus, 7th century BCE, Louvre

Modelling is the most common and simplest technique for terracotta sculpture. It is also used for the realization of bronzes: the prototypes are made out of raw clay. The small sizes are directly worked with the hand. For the larger models, the coroplast (κοροπλάστης koroplástēs, maker of figurines) pressed the clay pellets or wads against a wooden restraint.

=== Molding ===
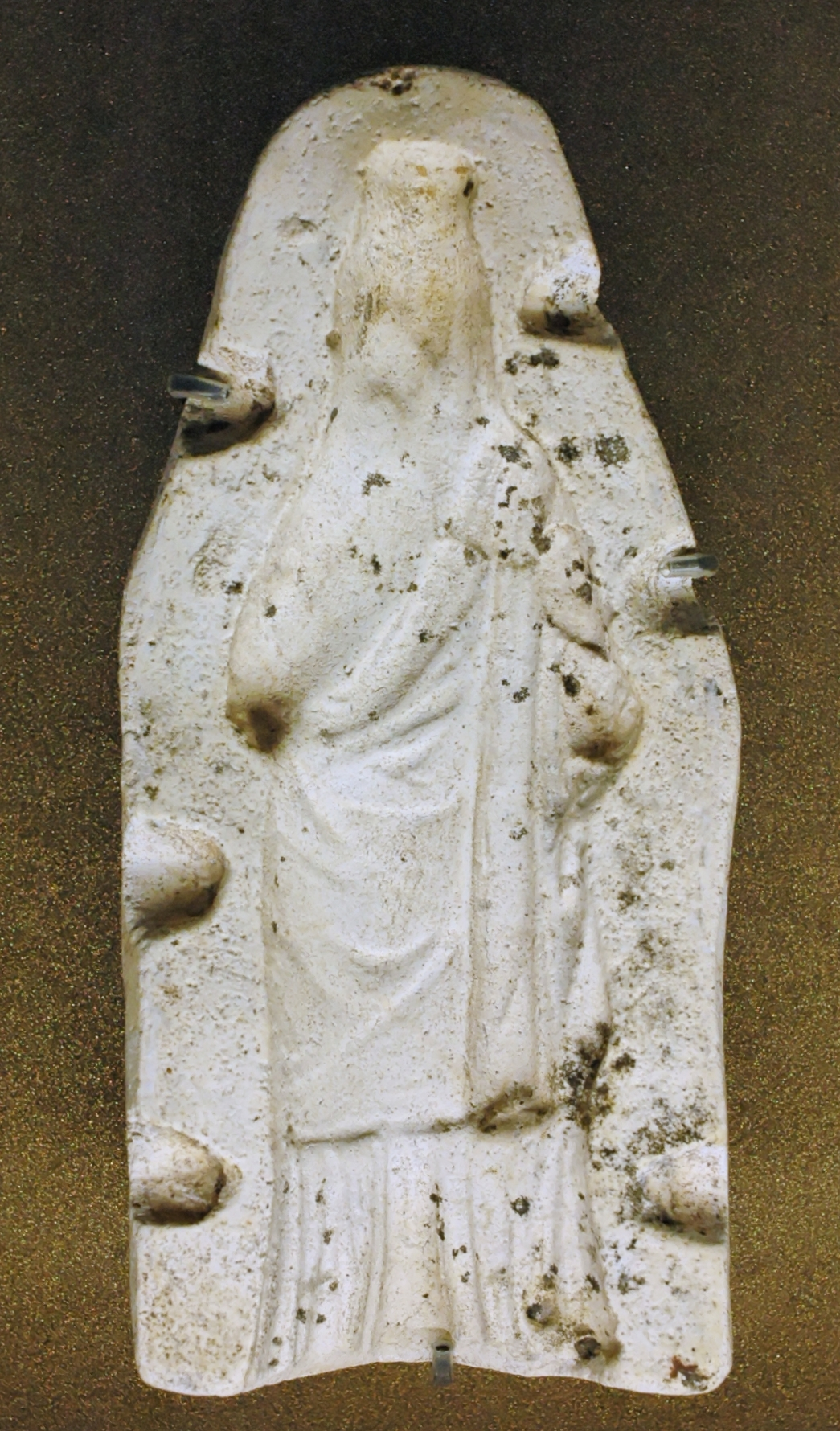
Plaster key mold for the reverse side of a figurine of Demeter-Isis, Louvre

The mold is obtained by application of a bed of clay or plaster on the prototype. Simple molds, used by the Greeks of the continent until the 4th century BC, are simply dried. Bivalvular molds, borrowed by the insular Greeks from the Egyptians, require cutting to obtain an obverse and a reverse, with which "keys" are sometimes associated protuberances allowing the two parts to fit better. When the piece becomes complicated, with important projections (arm, legs, head, clothing), the craftsman can cut out the mold in smaller parts. The piece is then dried.

The second phase consists of applying a layer of raw clay inside the mold, which can be incised beforehand in order to obtain effects of relief. The thinness of the layer varies according to the type of object to be realized. The faces of the mold are joined together, the object is then unmolded, and the craftsman can proceed to the final improvements, typically smoothing the junction. The craftsman also creates a small opening, a vent hole that allows steam to escape during the firing. The vent can also be used for assembly, allowing intervention inside the piece. The limbs are then joined to the body either by pasting them with slip, clay mixed with water, or by mortice and tenon joint.

=== Firing and completion ===
The piece is then fired in the kiln, with temperature ranging from 600 to 800 °C. Once the figurine is fired, a slip can be applied. The slip is sometimes itself fired at low temperature. In the beginning, the range of colours available was rather limited: red, yellow, black and blue. From the Hellenistic era on, orange, pink mauve, and green were added to that repertoire. The pigments were natural mineral dyes: ochre for yellow and red, coal for black, malachite for green.

== Religious functions ==
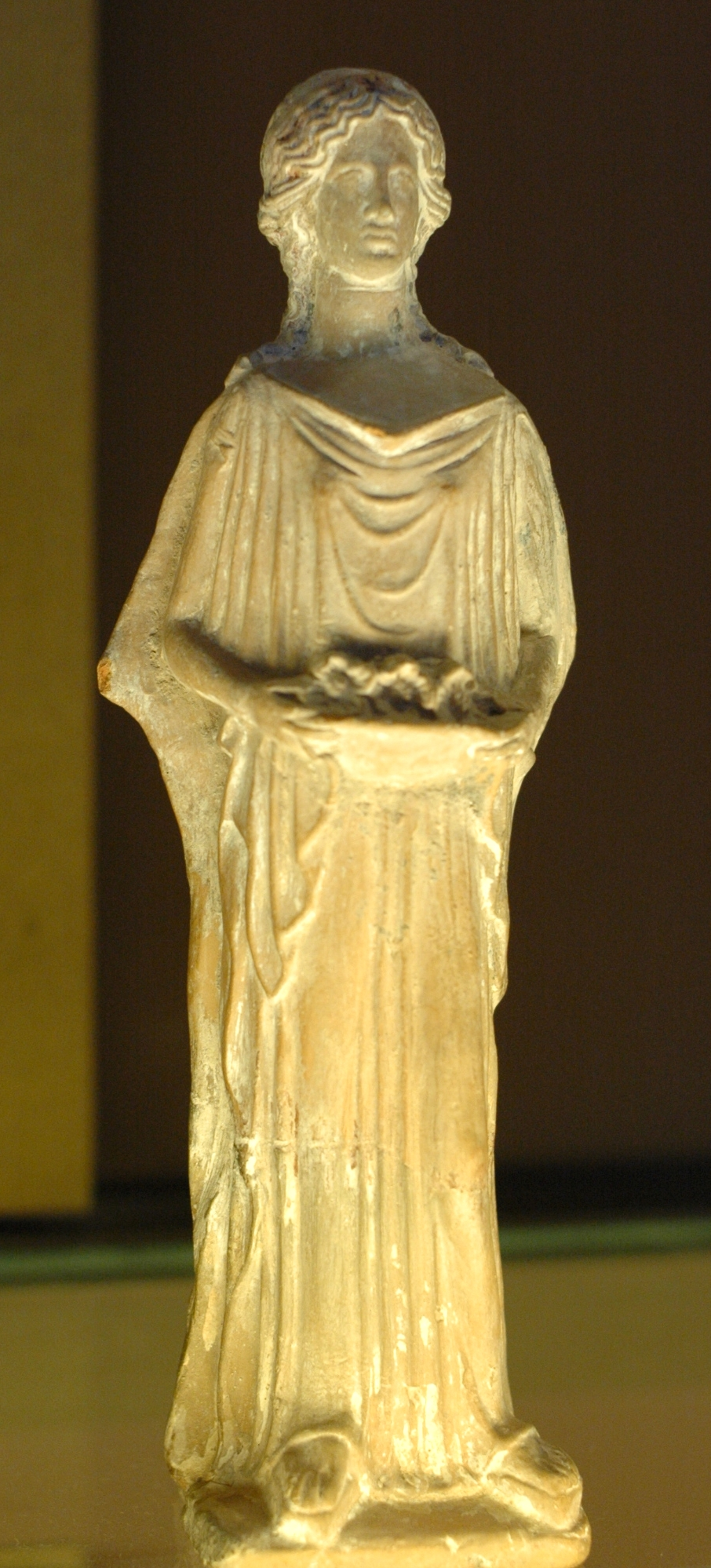
Woman bearing offerings, Peloponnese, 4th century BCE

Due to their low cost, figurines were widely used as religious offerings. That was their initial purpose, with the decorative aspect coming only later. Excavations at many ancient Greek temples have found abundant quantities of votive or funerary figurines and why there is almost no document written on their subject.

These figurines can present identification issues. These attributes make it possible to recognize a particular god in an unquestionable way, such as the bow for Artemis. Moreover, certain types of statuettes correspond to a precise form of worship related to a specific divinity. Sometimes, however, "visiting gods" complicate matters: these are figurines dedicated to a god who is not of that sanctuary. In addition, the great majority of the figurines simply represent a woman upright, without attribute. These latter figurines were offered in all sanctuaries, independently of the divinity.

The gift of figurines accompanied every moment of life. During pregnancy, future mothers had care to offer a figurine to Ilithyia, goddess of childbirth: the statuette represents a woman squatting, in full labor, according to the Eastern practice. Certain statuettes include a small cavity intended to receive smaller figurines, representative of their babies. During early childhood, figurines of squatting children were given —a representation of Eastern origin, arrived in Greece via Rhodes and Cyprus. The so-called "temple boys" were thought to protect children. Similar representations are also found in tombs. These figurines are of variable size, perhaps to indicate the age of the dead child. Their habit was to bury the dead accompanied by objects of daily custom: jewels, combs, figurines for the women; weapons and strigils for the men; figurines and toys for the children. Figurines were often voluntarily broken before being placed in the tomb.

The terracotta figurines were often purchased at the entry of the sanctuary. They were the offerings of the common people, who could not afford to dedicate more valuable objects. They were also used to replace offerings in kind, like animals or food. They were placed on the benches of the temples or close to the cult statue. They were also deposited in places of worship outdoors: Socrates recognized a sacred spring on seeing figurines on the ground (Phaedrus 230B). Figurines were dedicated to ask favours from a god as well as to thank him. When the figurines were too numerous in a temple, they were thrown in a "sacred dump". In that case, they are frequently broken to avoid recovery.

== Ludic and decorative functions ==
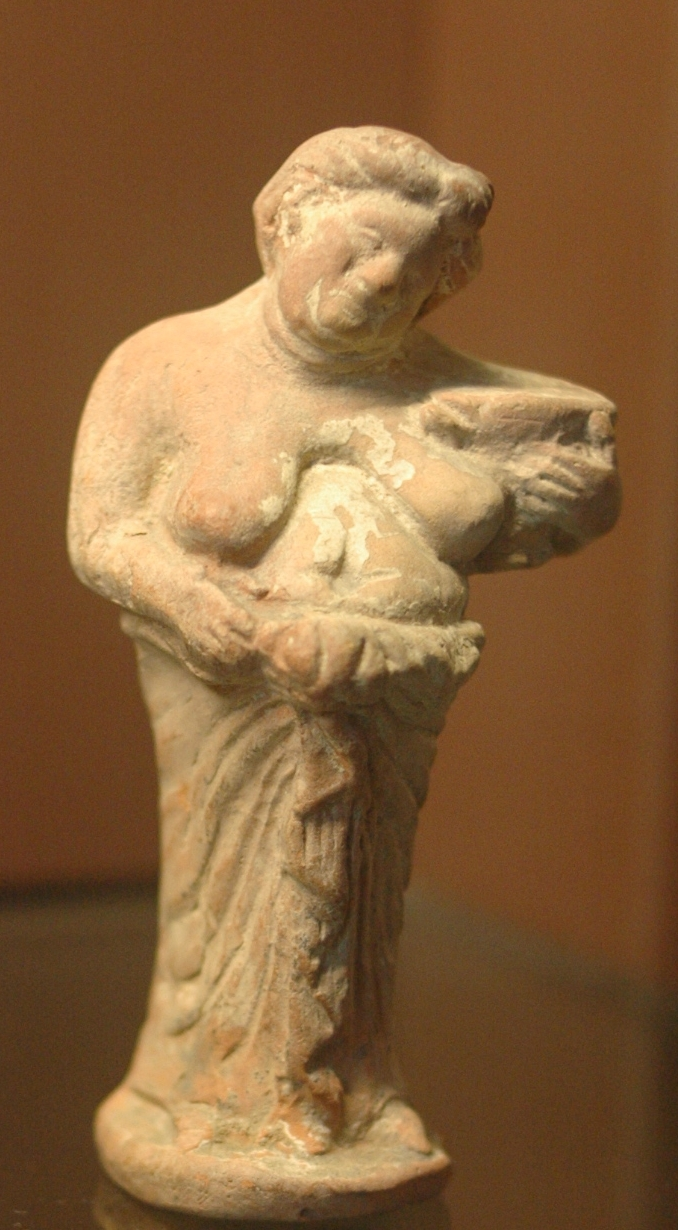
Grotesque: 350–300 BCE, musée du Louvre

From the 4th century BCE, the figurines acquired a decorative function. They began to represent theatrical characters, such as Julius Pollux recounts in his Onomasticon (2nd century CE): the slave, the peasant, the nurse, the fat woman, the satyr from the satyr play, etc. Figurine features might be caricatured and distorted. By the Hellenistic era, the figurines became grotesques: deformed beings with disproportionate heads, sagging breasts or prominent bellies, hunchbacks and bald men. Grotesques were a speciality of the city of Smyrna, but also produced throughout the Greek world, including in Tarsus and Alexandria.

Tanagra figurines were a mold-cast type of figurine produced from the later fourth century BCE, primarily in the Boeotian town of Tanagra. They were coated with a liquid white slip before firing, and were sometimes painted afterwards in naturalistic tints with watercolors, such as the "Dame en Bleu" ("Lady in Blue") at the Louvre. Tanagra figures depict real women, and some men and boys, in everyday costume, with familiar accessories such as hats, wreaths or fans. They seem to have been decorative pieces for the home, used in much the same way as their modern equivalents, though unlike these they were often buried with their owners. Some character pieces may have represented stock figures from the New Comedy of Menander and other writers. Others continued an earlier tradition of molded terracotta figures used as cult images or votive objects. Typically they were about 10 to 20 centimeters high.

Terracotta was often used for dolls and other children's toys. Examples have been found of articulated figurines or small horses, easy to manipulate for small hands. Sometimes, the nature of a figurine is difficult to determine, such as the curious bell-idols from Boeotia, which appear at the end of the 8th century BCE. They were equipped with a long neck and a disproportionate body, cylindrical and lathe-shaped. The arms were atrophied and the legs mobile. The head was pierced with a hole to hang them. It is uncertain if they were toys or votive offerings.

== See also ==
- Ancient Greek vase painting

== Bibliography ==
- (in French) S. Besque, Figurines et reliefs grecs en terre cuite, ed. Réunion des Musées Nationaux, Paris, 1994 (ISBN 2-7118-2793-3)
- (in French) V. Jeammet :
  - La Vie quotidienne en Grèce : des terres cuites pour la vie et l'au-delà, ed. Réunion des musées nationaux & Musée du Louvre, coll. « Chercheurs d'art », 2001
  - Feuillets du Louvre, Louvre et Réunion des Musées nationaux, vol. V, No. 332–334, 2000
- R. Higgins, Greek Terracottas, Methuen, coll. « Methuen's handbooks of archaeology », New York, 1967
- Hoffmann, Sanne (2023). Between deity and dedicator: the life and agency of Greek votive terracotta figurines. Berlin Boston: De Gruyter. ISBN 9783110768879.
- (in French) B. Holtzmann and A. Pasquier, L'Art grec, La Documentation française, coll. « Manuels de l'École du Louvre », 1998
- (in French) R. V. Nicholls, "La Fabrication des terres cuites", Histoire et archéologie, 81 (1984), pp. 24–31
- W. Stevenson, The Pathological grotesque Representations in Greek and Roman Art, Ann Arbor, 1975
