= Georges Chenet =

French archaeologist

- Born: 13 June 1881
- Died: 31 May 1951 (aged 69); Agen

Georges Chenet (13 June 1881 - 31 May 1951) was a French archeologist from Argonne who participated in excavation in Syria.

== Biography ==
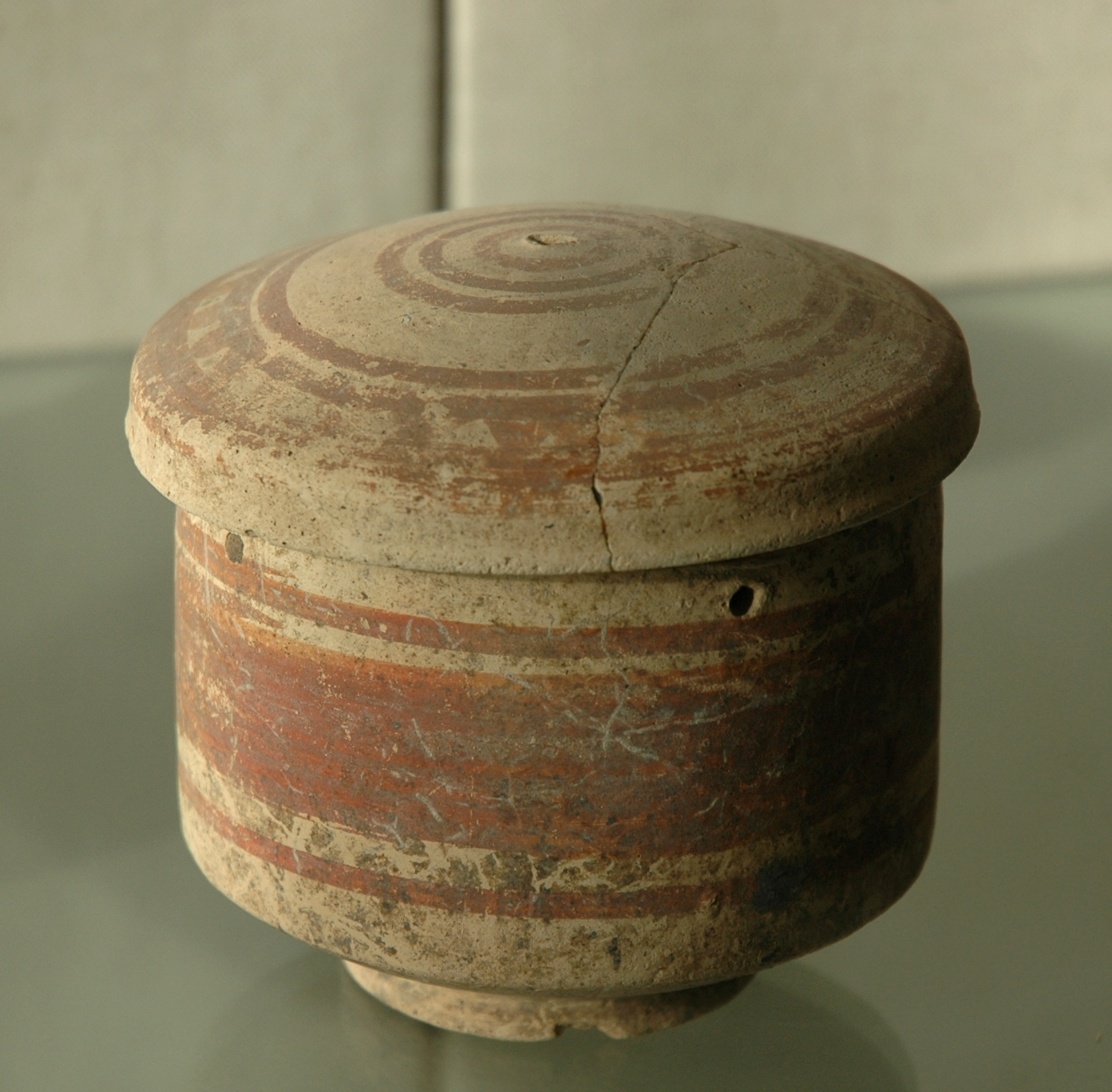
Pot and lid, painted terracotta, recent Bronze Age I. Discovered at Ras Shamra (formerly Ugarit), Eastern low city, tomb n° 53.

Chenet served in the French infantry during the First World War. He became the last Master tiler at Claon, where he was also elected mayor, serving in that office from de 1929 to 1939.

Chenet started his career as a specialist of Gallo-Roman pottery in Argonne, with no academic credentials or diploma. His work in the region focuses on the Gallo-Roman ceramics of Argonne, on the Merovingian cemetery of Lavoye and on the prehistory of the upper Aisne valley.

In the Middle East, Chenet worked with Claude F.-A. Schaeffer in the mission to Ras Shamra near Latakia, in Syria.

Chenet's personal collection were looted during the First World War and again in 1940; the remainder is kept at the National Archaeological Museum in Saint-Germain-en-Laye.

Part of his notes is kept at the Departmental Archives of Meuse.

In 2018, the Terres d'Argonne association published a biography, authored by Colette Méchin.

== Publications ==
Main publications

- Georges Chenet (1941). La céramique gallo-romaine d'Argonne du IVe siècle et la terre sigillée décorée à la molette. Mâcon: Protat frères. p. 194.
- Georges Chenet; Guy Gaudron (1955). La céramique sigillée d'Argonne des IIe et IIIe siècles. Supplément à Gallia. Paris: CNRS. p. 246.

Georges Chenet also published numerous articles:

- Georges Chenet (1927). "Un "Coucou" gallo-romain d'Argonne »". Revue des musées et collections archéologiques (10): 337–339.. Des extraits de cet article sont consultables dans la notice sur les sifflets en terre cuite du Mucem.du Mucem.
- Georges Chenet; Camille Jullian (1929). "Le Pont-des-Quatre-Enfants". Revue des Études Anciennes. 31 (4): 353. doi:10.3406/rea.1929.2549.
- Georges Chenet (1931). "Faucilles préhistoriques de Ras Shamra (Alaouites)". Bulletin de la Société préhistorique de France. 25 (11): 469–475.
- Georges Chenet (1945). "De quelques stationnements tardenoisiens en Argonne meusienne". Bulletin de la Société préhistorique de France. 42 (4–6): 96–97. doi:10.3406/bspf.1945.1946.

== See also ==
- Ugarit
