= Dipylon Krater =

Ancient greek funerary vase

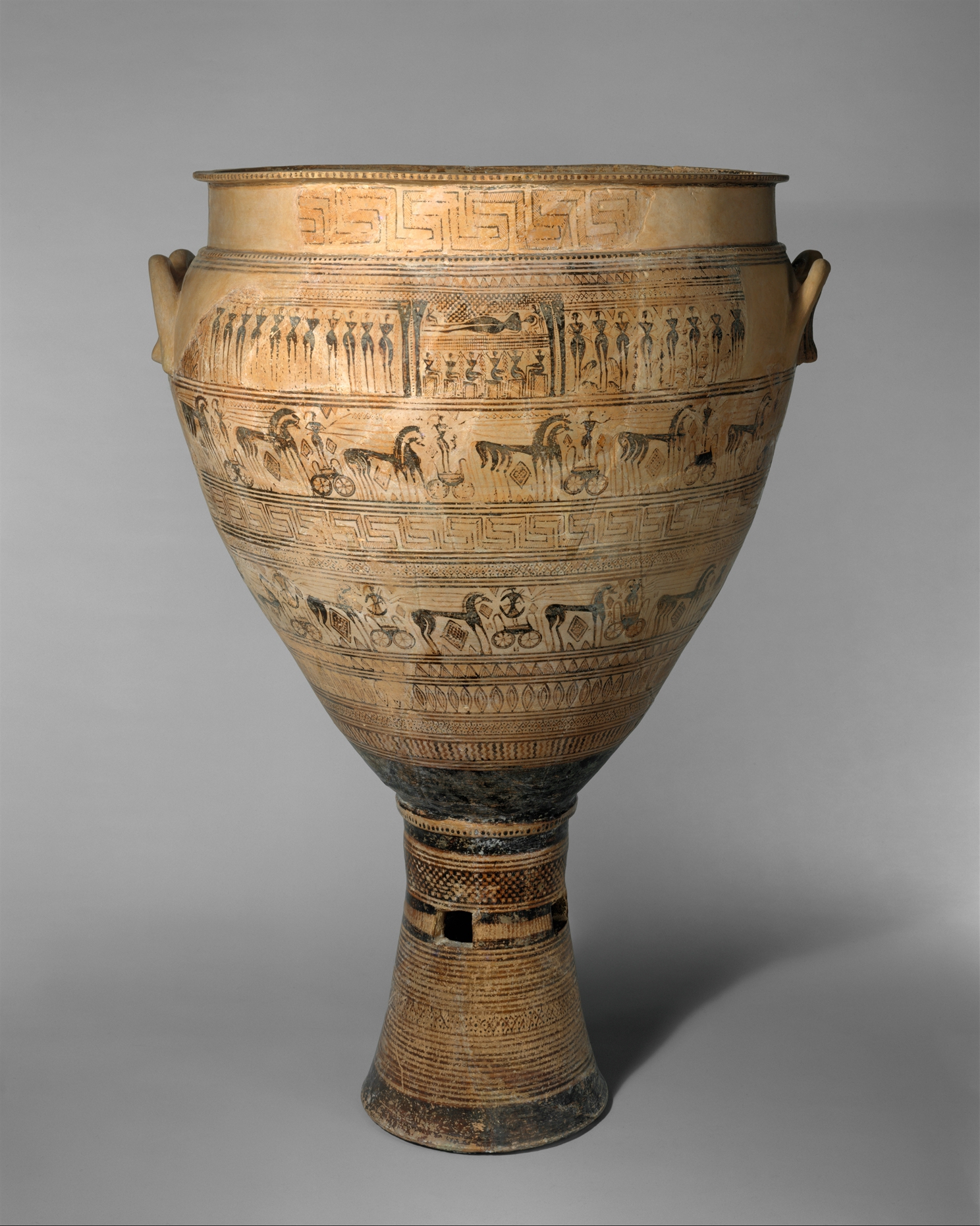
- Year: c. 750–735 BC
- Medium: Terracotta
- Location: The Met

Dipylon Kraters are Geometric period Greek terracotta funerary vases found at the Dipylon cemetery; near the Dipylon Gate, in Kerameikos. Kerameikos is known as the ancient potters quarter on the northwest side of the ancient city of Athens and translates to "the city of clay." A krater is a large Ancient Greek painted vase used to mix wine and water, but the large kraters at the Dipylon cemetery served as grave markers.

== History ==
=== Kraters in Ancient Greece ===
The Ancient Greeks had many forms of kraters, not just the Dipylon kraters. One form of kraters was the calyx krater; one of the largest kraters used to carry wine. This krater was meant to be used for wine because its calyx flower bottom was big enough to fit a psykter-shaped vase. The psykter vase would be used as cooler holding ice with the wine in the krater, or it would hold the wine with ice filling the calyx krater. The clear difference between the calyx krater and the Dipylon kraters, found in Kerameikos. Another form of krater is column kraters, which are large vases with columnar handles and decorated with mythological scenes. All these kraters hold their particular part in Ancient Greek civilization. For example, kraters were commonly used for symposiums and were mainly used for diluting wine, and masters of ceremonies did this process. In comparison, Dipylon kraters were used mainly from grave markers in the Dipylon cemetery.

=== The funerary process ===
The painted figural scenes on the Dipylon vases describe two of the three parts of a proper burial: a prothesis and an ekphora. A prothesis is the laying out a body for mourning at their home, where they washed and dressed the body. Prothesis worked to prepare the body for viewing. Ekphora is the body's transportation to the grave done before dawn. The third step is the interment, where the body and its belongings would be buried. Some items buried included wine, personal belongings, and occasionally other vases. The fourth step was commemoration which was the moment the psyche (soul) departed the body. This was considered to be the very first step of death by the ancient Greeks. It was required by the ancient Greeks to include all of the steps in a funeral because they believed that without it, Hades, god of the Underworld, would not allow the dead to pass over.

=== Creation of the vase ===
The process started with clay (keramos), which was always available in Greece to create the vase. Depending on the vase type being made, the clay being used would be settled in tanks to achieve different consistencies. After obtaining the clay, the potter would use a wheel and do the vase in sections, usually in horizontal sections. This process meant that each vase made was distinctive from the other vases. Then, before being placed in the kiln, the vase was to be decorated to be fired multiple times. These vases were very important to Kerameikos that the potter who worked on Dipylon kraters was called a Dipylon Master. Not only did the Dipylon Master specialize in the creation of the vase, but he also worked on the painting of the vases he created. The vases portrayed scenes and figures of the deceased life and the funerary process that went through to establish the funeral. This Dipylon Master was active around 760–750 BC and worked in Athens. Many Dipylon kraters are dated back to his workshop, including vases like the Dipylon Amphora and the Elgin Amphora.

=== Description of the Dipylon Kraters ===
==== Hirschfeld Krater ====
The Dipylon Krater found in Athens, also known as the Hirschfeld Krater, is 43 inches (110 cm) tall and has a circumference of 25.5 inches (65 cm). The monumental vase is hollow, with a hole at the bottom, indicating that it was not used as a mixing bowl like regular kraters. At the Dipylon Cemetery, where it was found, kraters marked the graves of men. The grave markers were also subject to be bought by wealthier families. Decorations occupy the entire vase, separated into registers containing abstract motifs or figural designs in a dark-on-light style.

The prothesis scene on the Dipylon Krater, features standing women with triangular torsos surrounding a prostrate body underneath a checkered burial shroud. The women raise their arms to their head, tearing out their hair as a sign of mourning for the deceased. Abstract geometric motifs and animals fill space in between the figures in a dense style characteristic of the Late Geometric period. Underneath, the ekphora scene displays warriors with chariots, hinting out the dead man's military history while the hourglass-shaped shields transporting the body in a funeral procession.

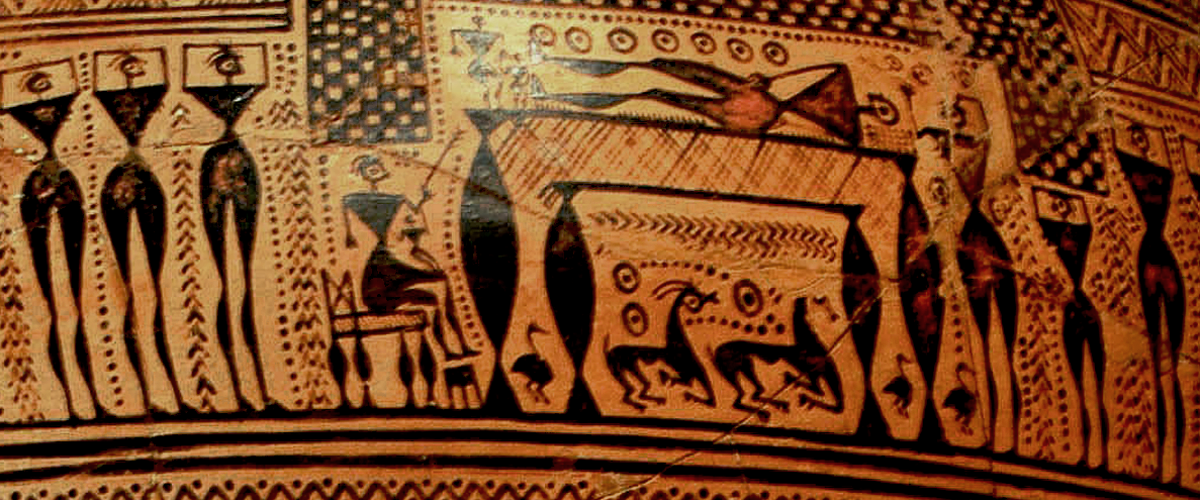

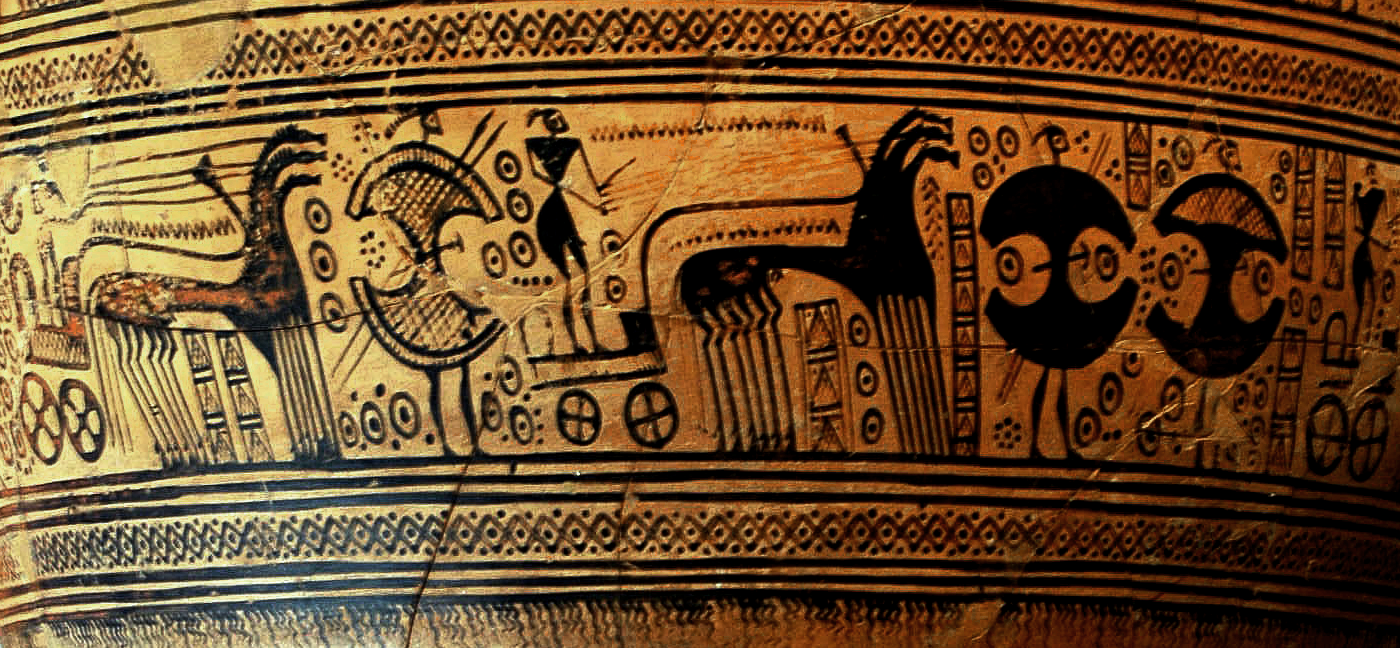

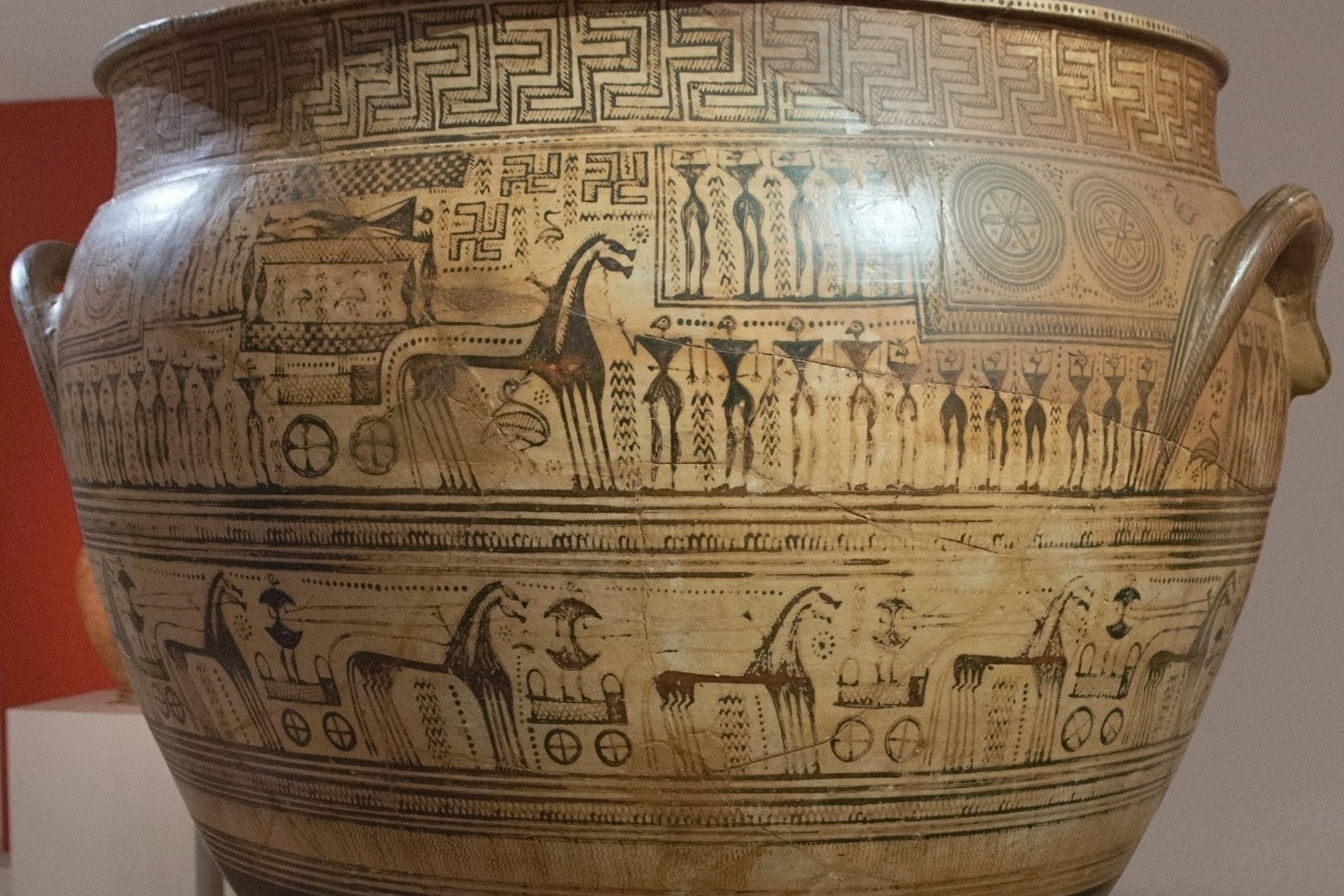

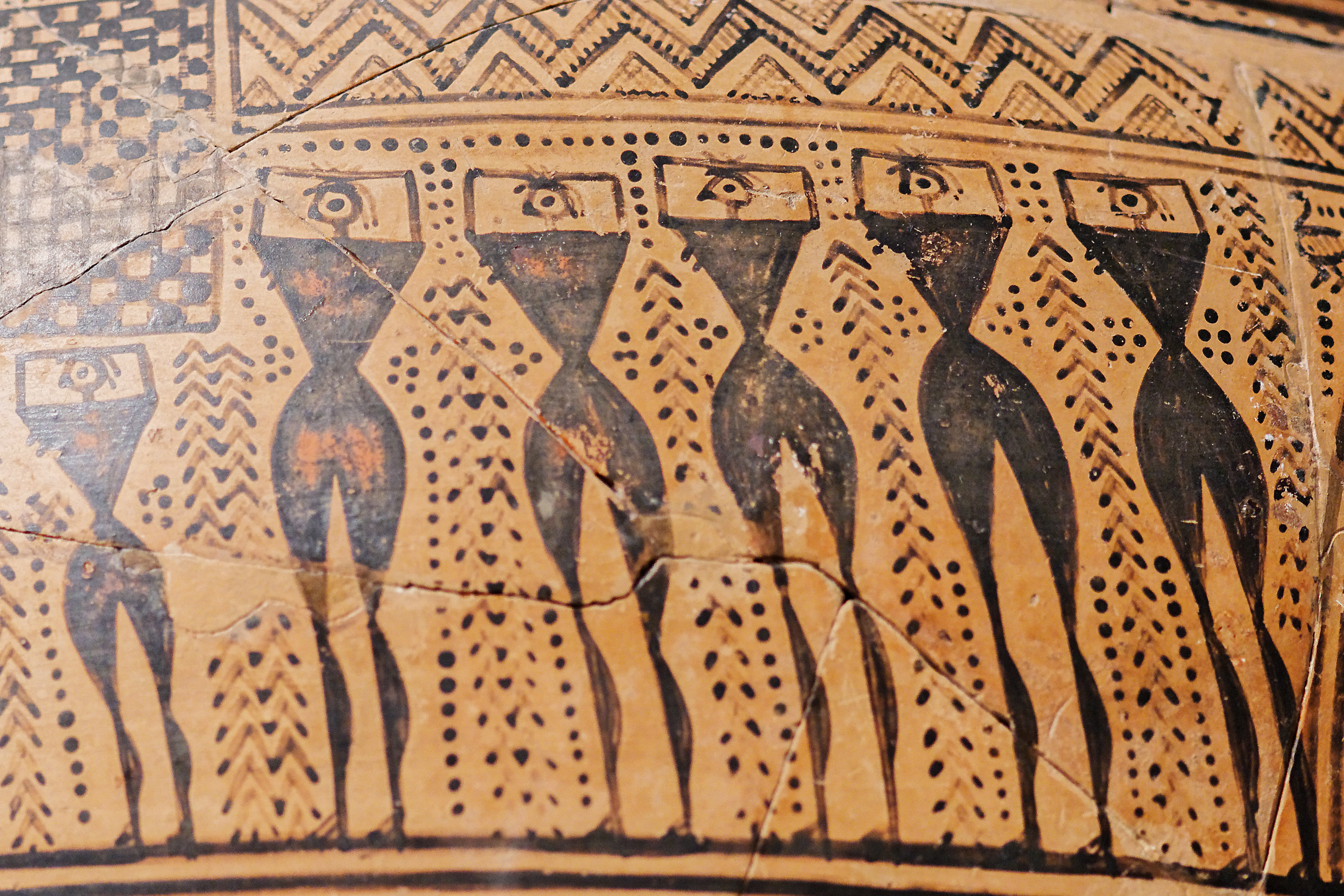

==== Dipylon Amphora ====
Elgin Amphora
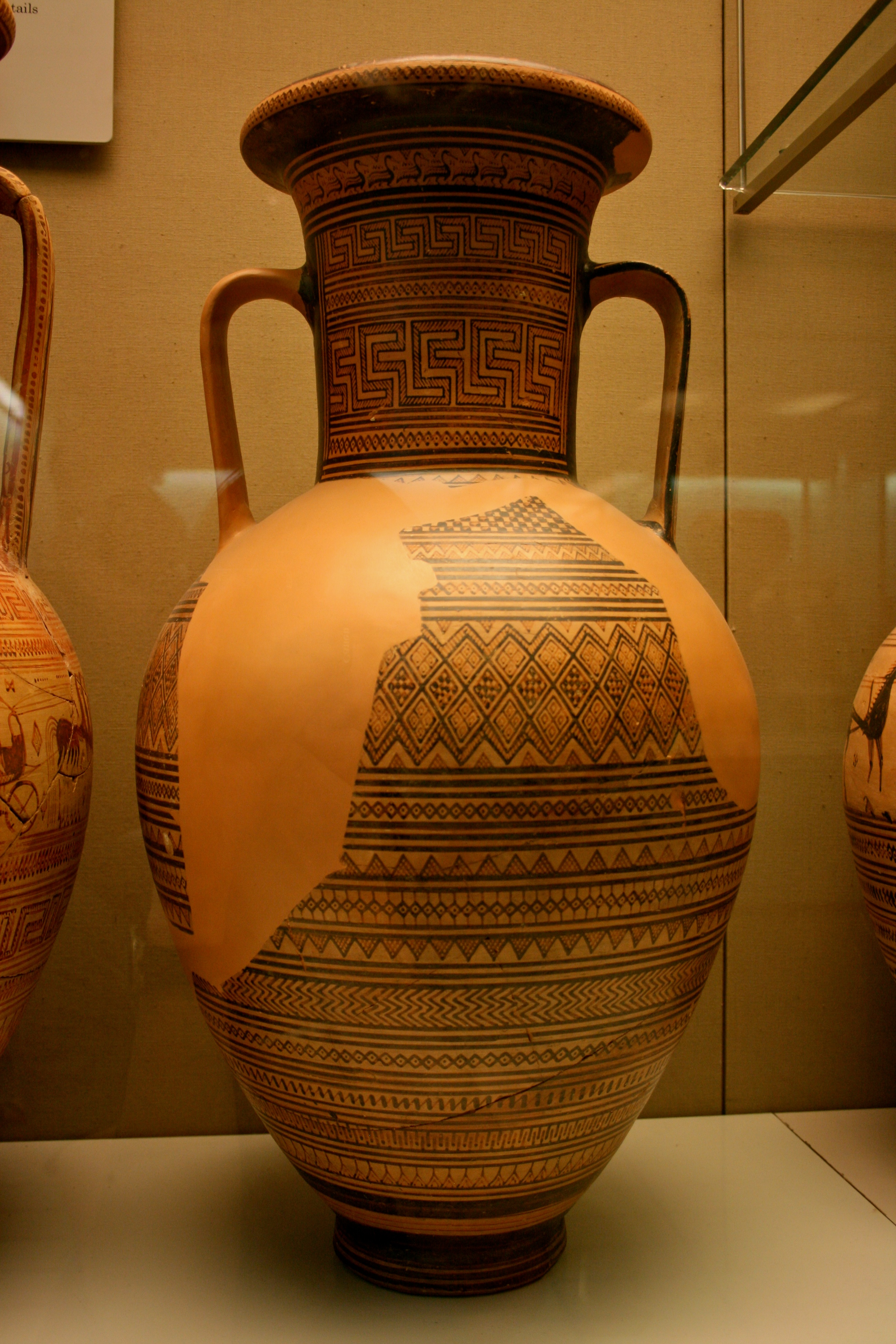
- Year: c. 760–750 BC
- Medium: Terracotta
- Location: British Museum, in London

The Dipylon Amphora is the female version of the Dipylon krater. They both hold the same significance; their name and slight shape make each one different. The Dipylon amphora has a long and narrow neck roughly one-third of its size and is decorated with goats and geometric shapes. The body of the vase is vast and decorated with human figures and geometric shapes. On the body, there are also short handles. These handles are specific to Dipylon amphoras. The handles tell others that a woman lays in the grave that it marks. At the foot of the vase, there is a hole designated for loved ones to pour libations.

On the body of the amphora, we can see the images of mourning figures surrounding the dead woman. Their bodies are made out of triangles which connect back to the style of the Geometric period. Their arms are positioned above their heads, showing a strong emotion of despair and pain. We can tell that there is pain towards this woman's death because we can see the tears pouring down their faces in 'm' shapes.

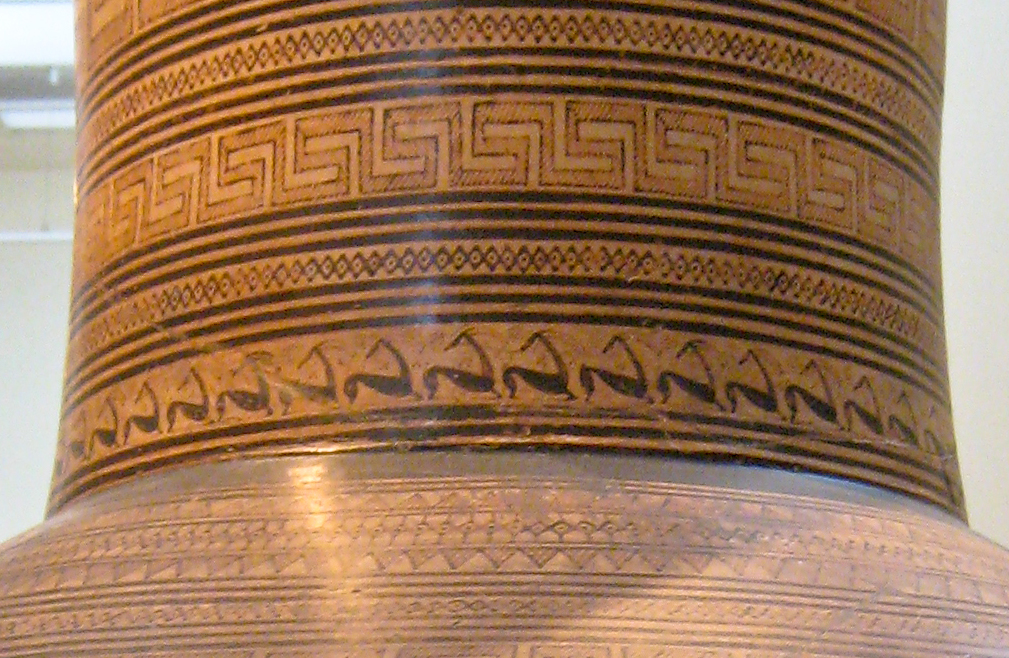

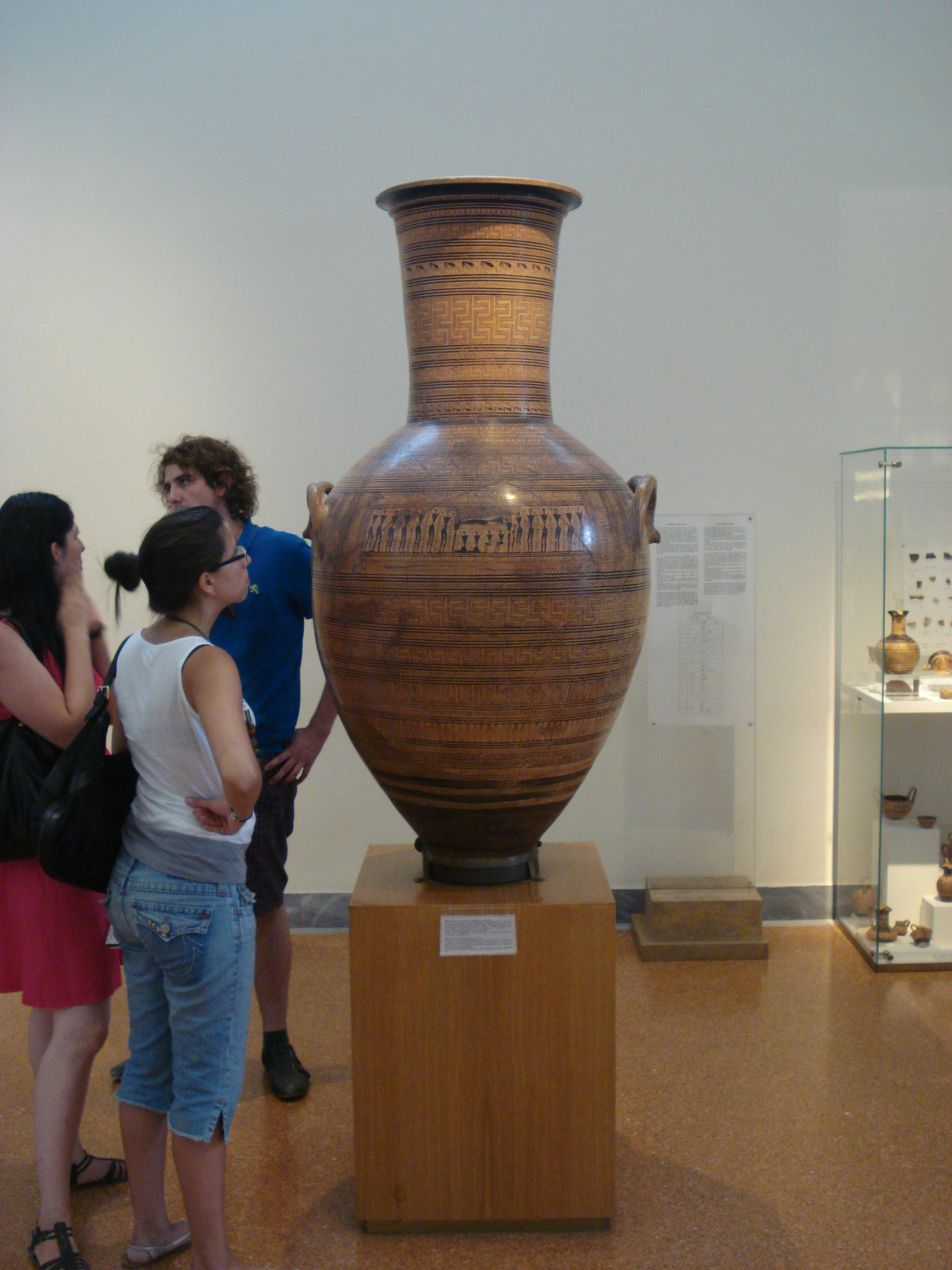

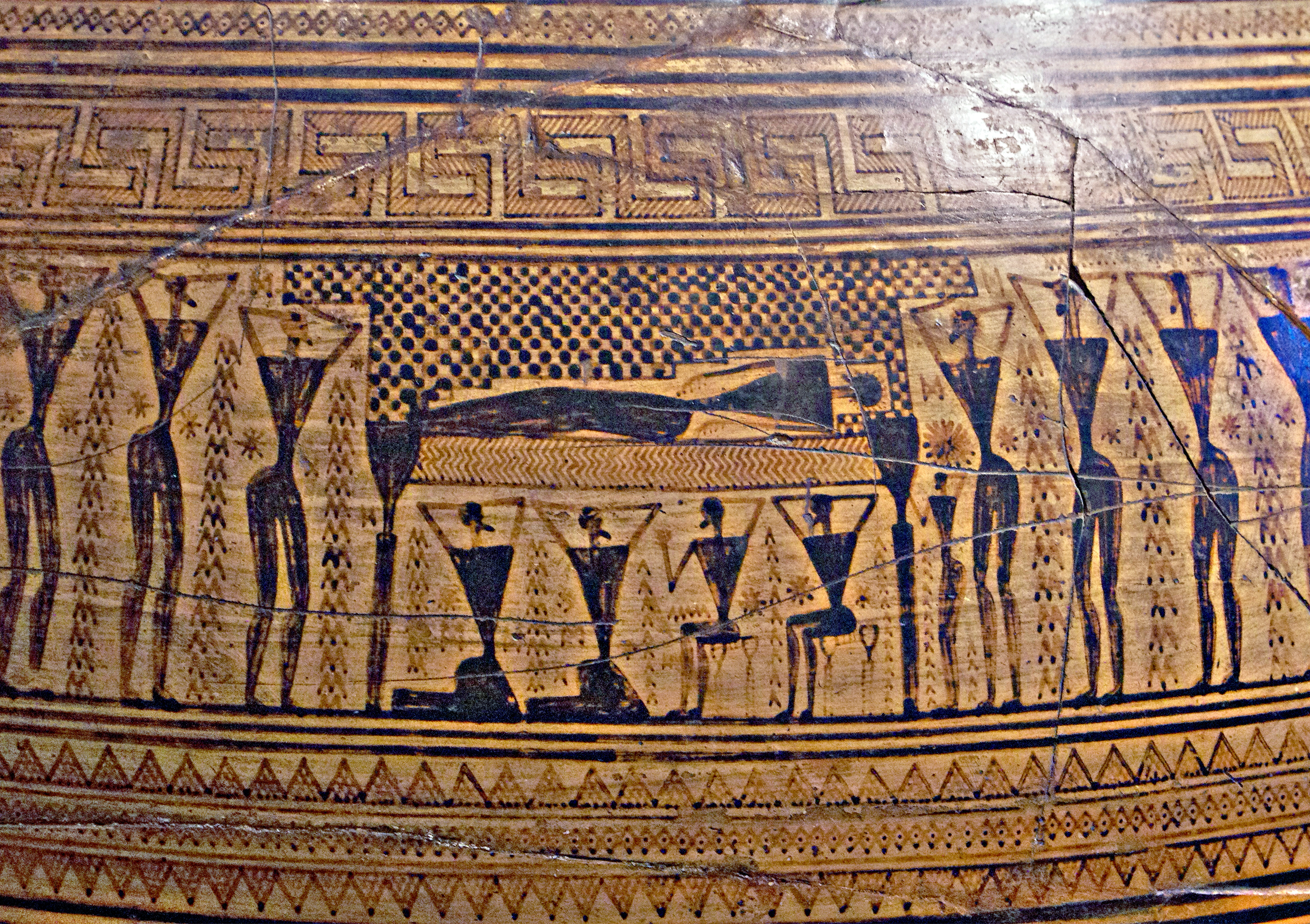

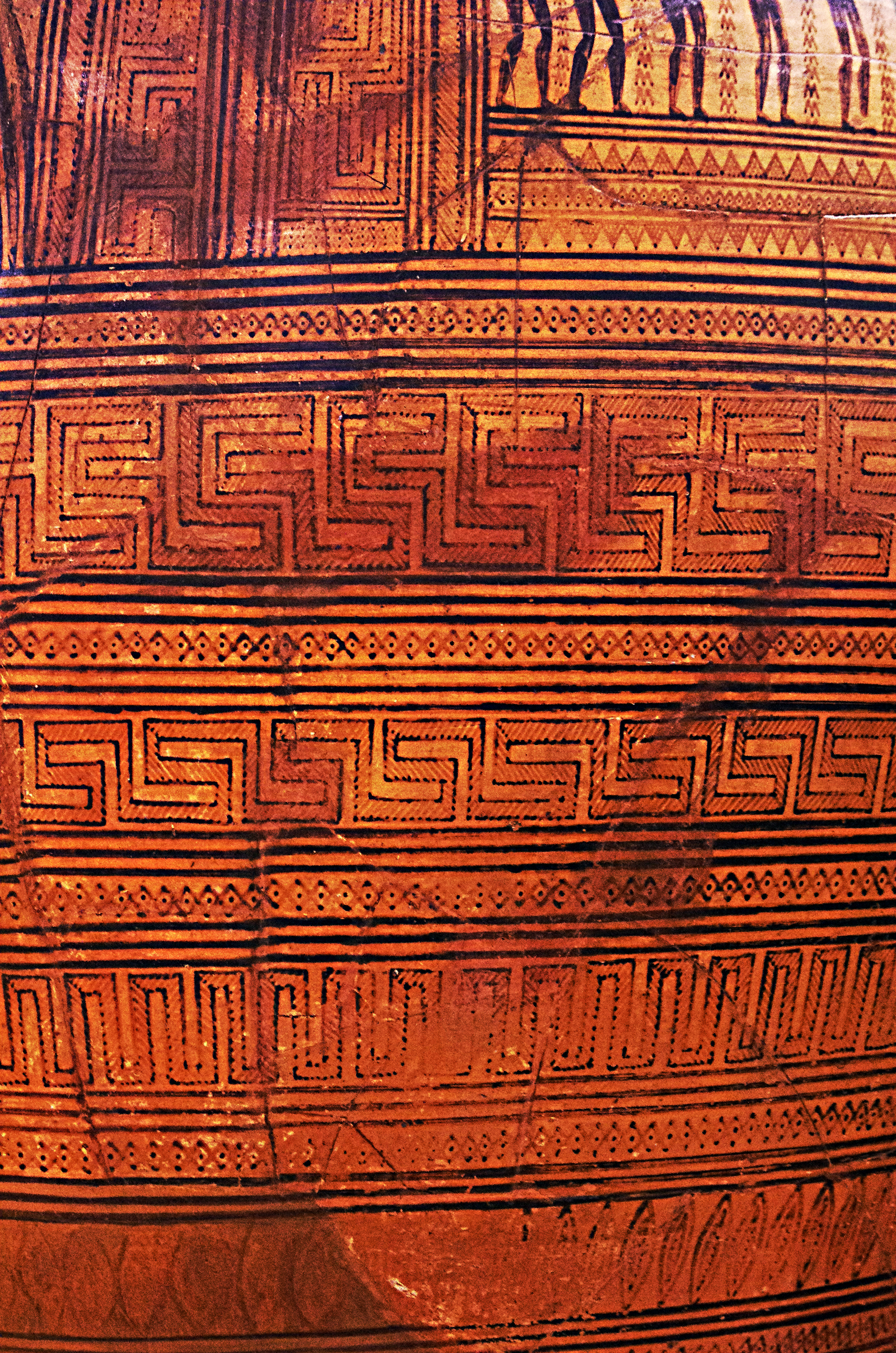

==== Elgin amphora ====
The Elgin amphora is slightly different from the Dipylon amphora. The Elgin amphora does not have a hole at the bottom compared to other kraters because it was buried instead of used as a grave marker. It is thought that it was filled with wine during the funeral feast and then later buried with the female deceased. When unearthed, it was missing a couple of pieces but was later reconstructed and is currently at the British Museum in London.

Since this amphora was reconstructed, we only get to see the decorative patterns that range from triangles to meanders on the vase's neck. Meanders are Greek key patterns that are a continuous line that folds back and forth that mimics the ancient Maeander River of Asia Minor. It is 26 inches (66 cm) tall and 9 inches (23 cm) wide. This amphora is seen as a clear example of the Geometric period and style.

== See also ==
- Death in ancient Greek art
- Dipylon inscription
