= Elgin Amphora =

Ancient Greek amphora

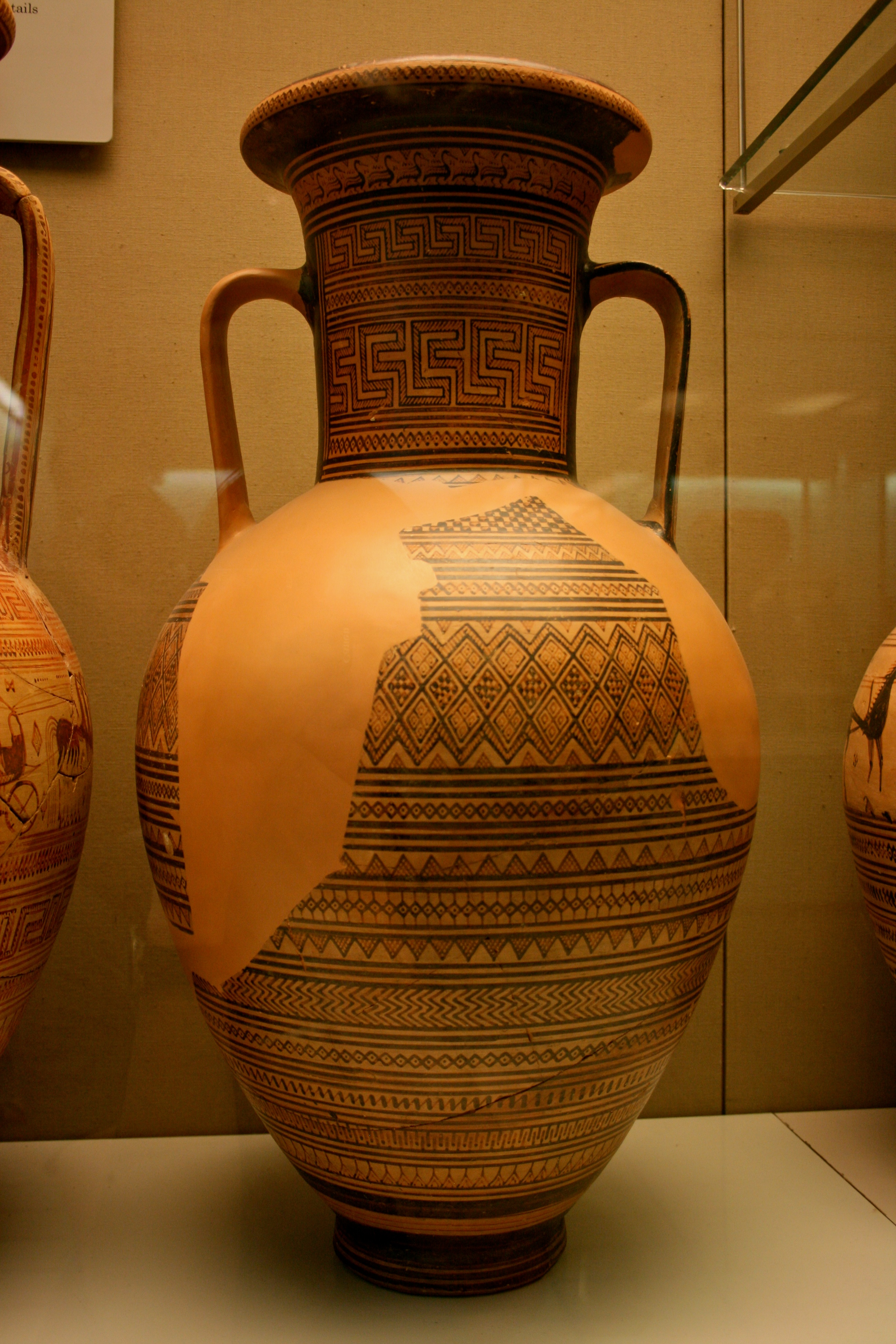
Elgin Amphora, reconstructed at the British Museum

The Elgin Amphora is a large Ancient Greek neck-handled amphora made from fired clay in Athens around 760 to 750 BC. The ceramic vessel may have been used to hold wine at a funeral feast, and then entombed with the cremated remains of the deceased. Fragments have survived, decorated in the Late Geometric style, and attributed to an unknown artist given the Notname of "the Dipylon Master", one of the earliest individually identifiable Greek artists. The fragments have been restored to reconstruct a single but incomplete vessel, 67 centimetres (26 in) high, which is now displayed at the British Museum in London.

The amphora stands on a rim foot. The outer surface of its ovoid body is decorated with bands of geometric patterns, including repeated lozenges in a tapestry design around the widest part of the amphora, rows of triangles, and a chequered pattern on its shoulders. The tall cylindrical neck bears a double meander, and a frieze of water birds just below the rim. The strap handles are decorated with dotted serpents.

Fragments of the amphora were excavated in Athens by Giovanni Battista Lusieri in 1804–6. The exact find location is not known, but it was probably somewhere between the Mouseion Hill and the River Ilisos. It was acquired by Thomas Bruce, 7th Earl of Elgin. His descendants sold it to John Hewett before the 1950s, and it was then acquired by Robert Erskine, the son of John Erskine, Lord Erskine. A fragment was sold at Sotheby's in 1994, and later reunited with the other fragments which were bought privately. It was loaned to the British Museum, and then acquired by the British Museum in 2004 from the Trustees of the Stanford Place Collection, using £40,000 provided by the Art Fund, and funds from the Wolfson Foundation, Alexander Talbot Rice, British Museum Friends, the Caryatid Fund, and the Society of Dilettanti Charitable Trust
