= Dipylon Amphora =

Ancient Greek painted vase

The Dipylon Amphora
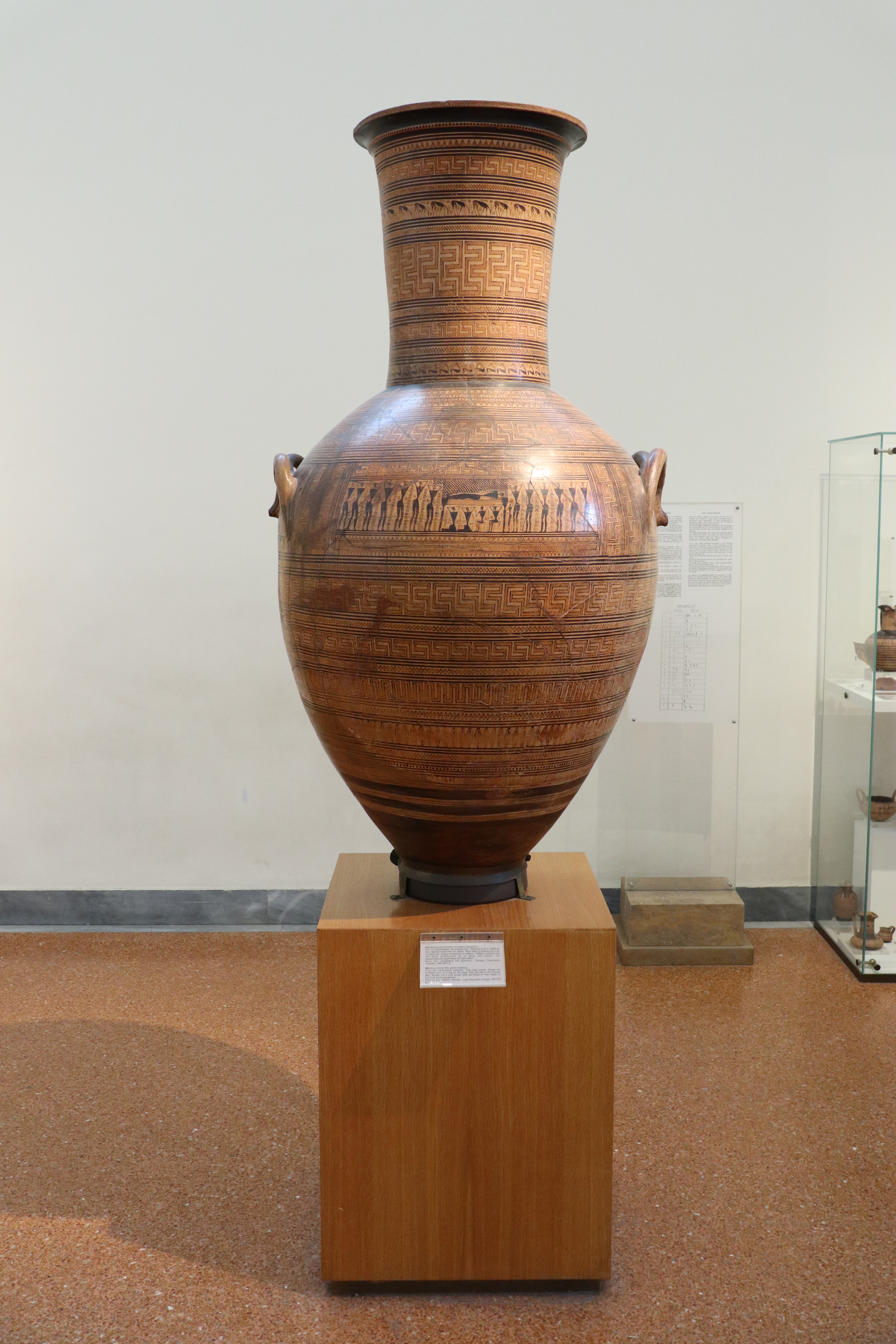
- Artist: Dipylon Master
- Year: 760–750 BC
- Catalogue: Athens 804
- Type: Sculpture
- Medium: Clay and slip
- Location: National Archaeological Museum, Athens

The Dipylon Amphora (also known as Athens 804) is a large Ancient Greek painted vase, made around 760–750 BC, and is now held by the National Archaeological Museum, Athens. Discovered at the Dipylon cemetery, this stylistic vessel belonging to the Geometric period is credited to an unknown artist: the Dipylon Master. The amphora is covered entirely in ornamental and geometric patterns, as well as human figures and animal-filled motifs. It is also structurally precise, being twice as tall as it is wide, and having a neck that is half the height of its body. These decorations use up every inch of space, and are painted on using the black-figure technique to create the silhouetted shapes. Inspiration for the Greek vase derived not only from its intended purpose as a funerary vessel, but also from artistic remnants of Mycenaean civilization prior to its collapse around 1100 BC. The Dipylon Amphora signifies the passing of an aristocratic woman, who is illustrated along with the procession of her funeral consisting of mourning family and friends situated along the belly of the vase. The woman's nobility and status is further emphasized by the plethora of detail and characterized animals, all which remain in bands circling the neck and belly of the amphora.

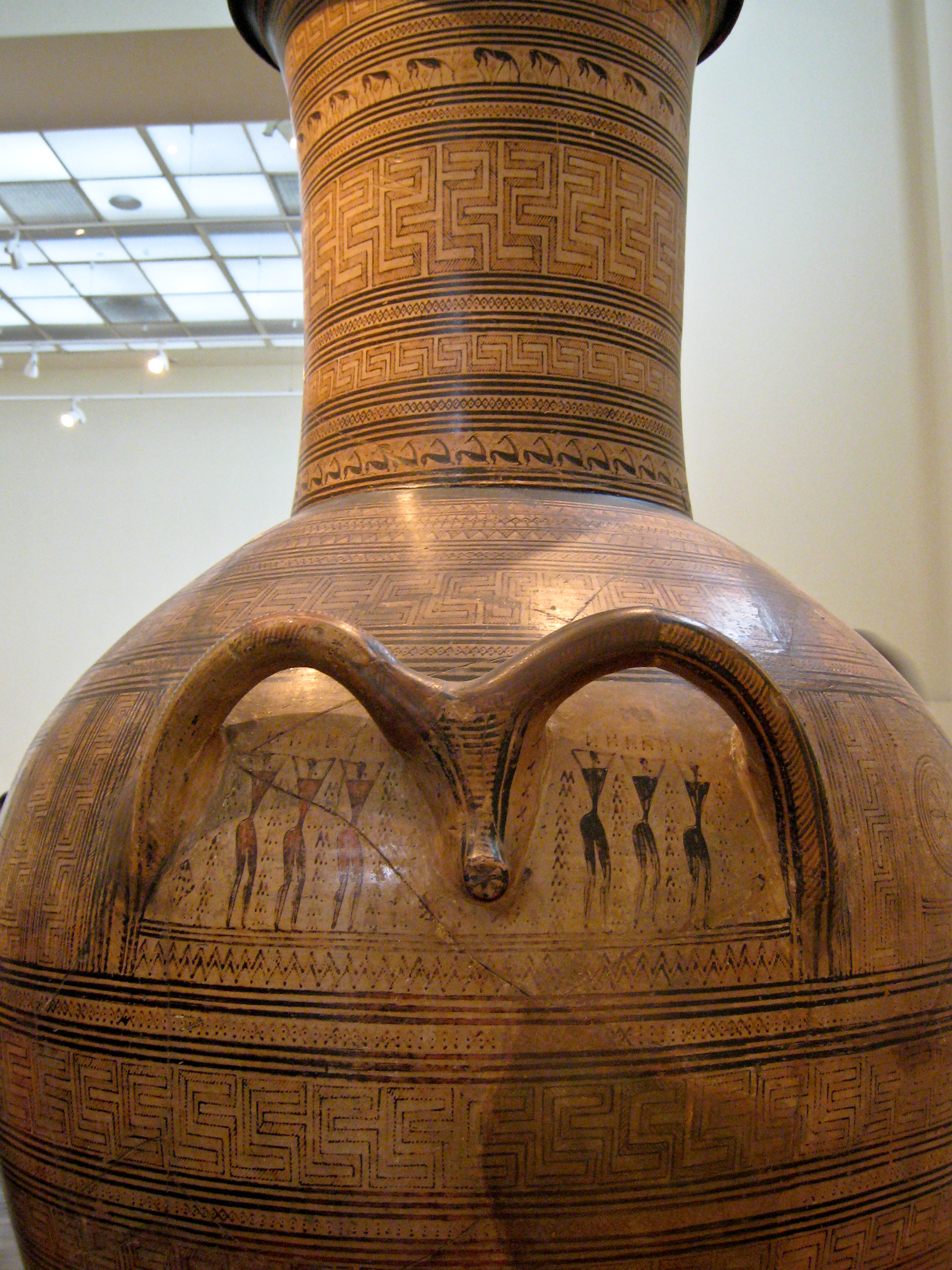
Detail of mourners below the handle, geometric patterns and animal friezes on the neck

== Discovery ==
The Dipylon Amphora was found intact on an aristocratic gravesite at the Dipylon cemetery, near the Dipylon Gate, in Kerameikos, the ancient potters' quarter on the northwest side of the ancient city of Athens. The cemetery is referred to as such, for that it was located near the Dipylon, or "double gate", which was also the city gate.

=== Attribution ===
It is one of around 50 examples amongst the Dipylon gravesites attributed to an unknown artist given the notname of "the Dipylon Master". Also known as the Dipylon Painter, the Dipylon Master is one of the earliest individually identifiable Greek artists, who specialized in not just large funerary vases, but pitchers, high rimmed bowls, tankards, as well as giant and standard sized oinochoai. This artist was therefore named for their supposed work on many stylized pieces found within these graves that have been ascribed to the same creator and workshop by multiple historians.

The main characteristics of the Dipylon Painter's works include characteristic human figures where geometric shapes are utilized including triangular torsos that narrow at the waist, concave-outlined chests, prominent chins, and wasp-like legs that are thinner towards the feet. These figures are silhouetted, as well as the animals motifs, and are all deliberately placed as to not overlap one another, emphasizing the theme of pattern by the painter.

== Description ==
The amphora was made on a potter's wheel in three sections that were joined to form a single large vessel, standing at over five feet tall (1.55 m).The artist's construction was intended to fit the specific proportions of having the twice the height of its width, and possessing a neck that's half of the body's length. The base has a hole to allow libations to be poured for the dead, and it has small handles on the shoulders of the ovoid body.

The supposed purpose for the shape of the Dipylon Amphora potentially stems from the artist's usage of the composition for the decorated registers on the piece. A specialist of ancient ceramics, Dr. Thomas Mannack, indicates that the style of the Geometric period derived certain aspects of the Protogeometric and intertwined new features, hence the separated bands on the neck and body of the pottery. The geometric patterns are what define the style, with an array of shapes within and around the friezes: including battlements, concentric circles, meanders, and key patterns. The entirety of the vase, excluding the main frieze, is ornamented with precisely balanced patterns utilizing light and dark pigments; these decorative forms including meanders have been proposed by multiple scholars to be the invention of the very Dipylon Master.

The belly of the vase between the handles is not only the widest section, but structurally the most delicate since the clay is the thinnest in width at that point, further dictating that the frieze within that format is the most important visual aspect of the scene. A rectangular panel between the handles on one side depicts a prothesis scene, the lying in repose of a draped dead woman on a bier, with a checkered shroud above the body, and stylized mourners to either side. There are thirty-nine human figures total- both men and women- on the handle zone of the piece. Placed underneath each handle are six figures, with eight more on the backside panel, and a large group of nineteen people depicted on the frontal frieze. The tall cylindrical neck, includes bands of repeated stylized deer and goats. The goats in particular, are shown with their legs tucked underneath and heads turning back upon themselves, almost as if to simulate the meanders throughout the amphora.

== Historical context ==
The Ancient Greeks had a plethora of inspiration from the surrounding regions' cultures, but the shift of political and social power presumably impacted the intake of artistic reference towards the Geometric style. Concerning the collapse of the Mycenaean culture, contact became closed off from highly developed surrounding Eastern empires that the Greeks referred to for artistry and innovation. As a result, it is assumed that many artists were compelled to return to Greek-rooted forms of art. Basketry and weaving were just some of the crafts possibly utilized for depicting visual motifs within Geometric vase painting. These types of crafts were first thought to be integrated by the Dipylon Master within the Geometric style, and would also elucidate why their works are amidst of some of the first figural scenes discerned on Greek vessels since the fall of the Mycenaean civilization.

=== Funerary rituals ===
The Dipylon amphora illustrates the funerary practices of Athen's wealthy population, which is proven by its location at the aristocratic cemetery. These kraters and amphorae were positioned upright over the graves as markers and possibly functioned as libation chutes, as postulated by R.M. Cook. Alternatively, Jeffery M. Hurwit suggests that the vase not only received offerings, but served mainly as a commemorative piece; it symbolized the noblewoman's memorial monument and signified her tomb. Athenians in previous centuries would cremate the dead and place their ashes in the properly designated vessels. However, this shifted when inhumations resurfaced in Greek religious practice and culture; and as a result the remains were placed underneath the amphorae and kraters, which is signified by the findings near and under the Dipylon Amphora.

=== Subject ===
This funerary monument's size emphasizes the seemingly elite status of the deceased who is also presumed to be a woman, due to the vases commonly indicating the gender: kraters for men and amphorae for women. There is further evidence in the graves at the Dipylon cemetery containing items of wealthy women that indicated their status; these artifacts were discovered by amongst and within the large-belly handled amphorae. Painted amphorae of this size were made as grave markers. It is presumed that the vase was solely created for the dead woman depicted on the frieze.

In the frieze, the woman's body is shown lying on a bier; depicted on top of her is a checkered shroud that covers her entirely from the top of her head to her feet. Interestingly, the pall curves around the deceased to provide clarity for the audience of the piece so they can recognize the dedication of this individual. The nearby figures surrounding the noblewoman are likely grieving friends and family; all of the members of the funeral are shown displaying a symbolic gesture of intense grief in which the hands are elevated towards the head.

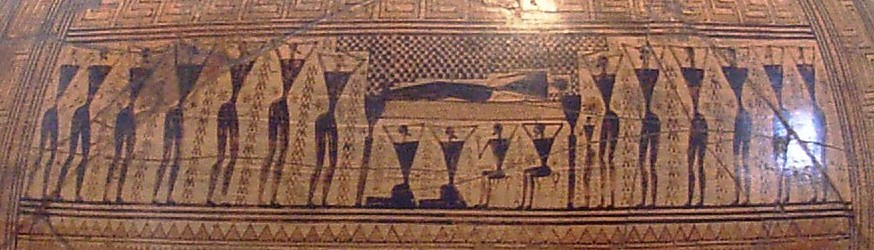
Detail of the prothesis scene

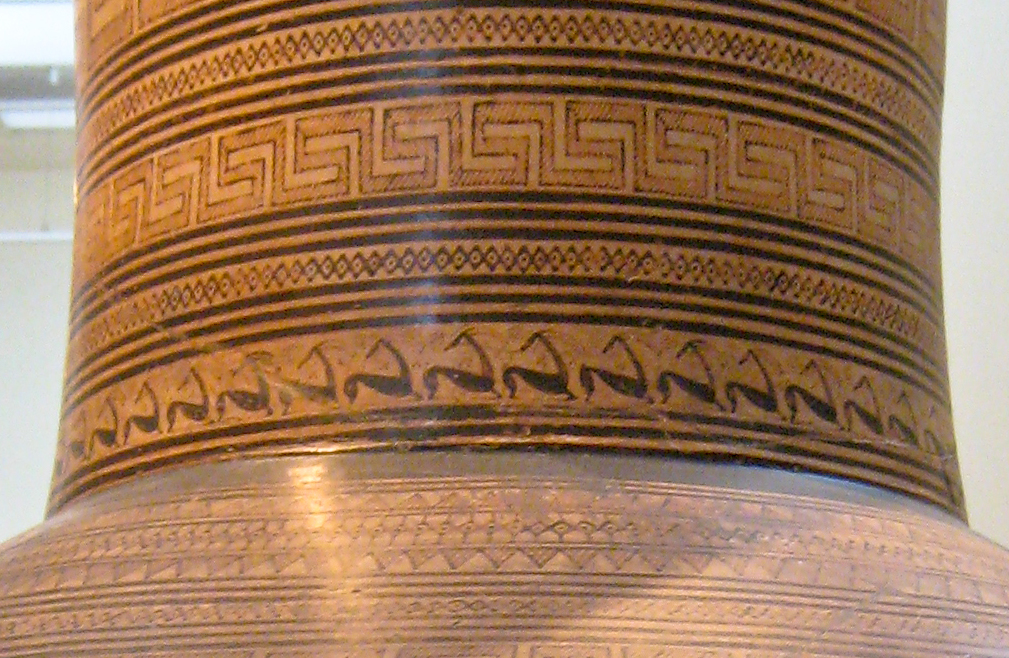
Detail of bottom of the neck, with the band of goats

== See also ==
- Dipylon Krater
- Dipylon inscription
