= Dipylon Master =

Unidentified ancient Greek vase painter

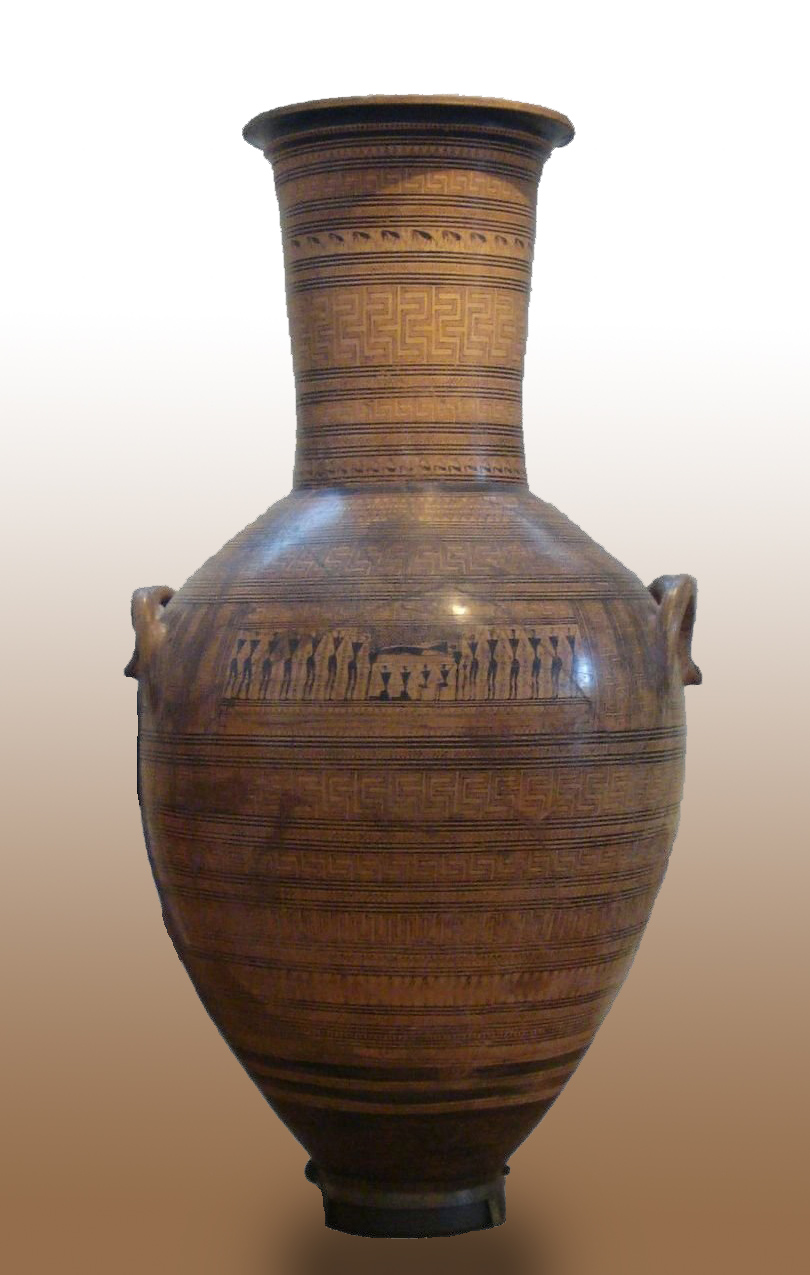
The Dipylon Amphora, mid-8th century BC, National Archaeological Museum, Athens.

The Dipylon Master was an ancient Greek vase painter who was active from around 760–750 BC. He worked in Athens, where he and his workshop produced large funerary vessels for those interred in the Dipylon Gate cemetery, whence his name comes. His work belongs to the very late stage of the Geometric Style. His vases served as grave markers and libation receptacles for aristocratic graves and as such are decorated with a depiction of the prothesis scene representing the mourning of the deceased. Almost 50 vases have been attributed to the Dipylon Master and his workshop. Examples include the Dipylon Amphora in National Archaeological Museum, Athens, and the Elgin Amphora in the British Museum.

== See also ==
- List of Greek vase painters
- Pottery of ancient Greece

== References and sources ==
Sources

- Roisman, Joseph, and translated by J.C Yardley, Ancient Greece from Homer to Alexander (Blackwell Publishing Ltd, 2011) ISBN 1-4051-2776-7
- Boardman, J. Early Greek Vase Painting: 11th–6th Centuries BC: A Handbook (World of Art). London: Thames and Hudson Publishing, May 1998. ISBN 0-500-20309-1 (ISBN 9780500203095).
