= Ionic vase painting =

Ionic vase painting was a regional style of ancient Greek vase painting.

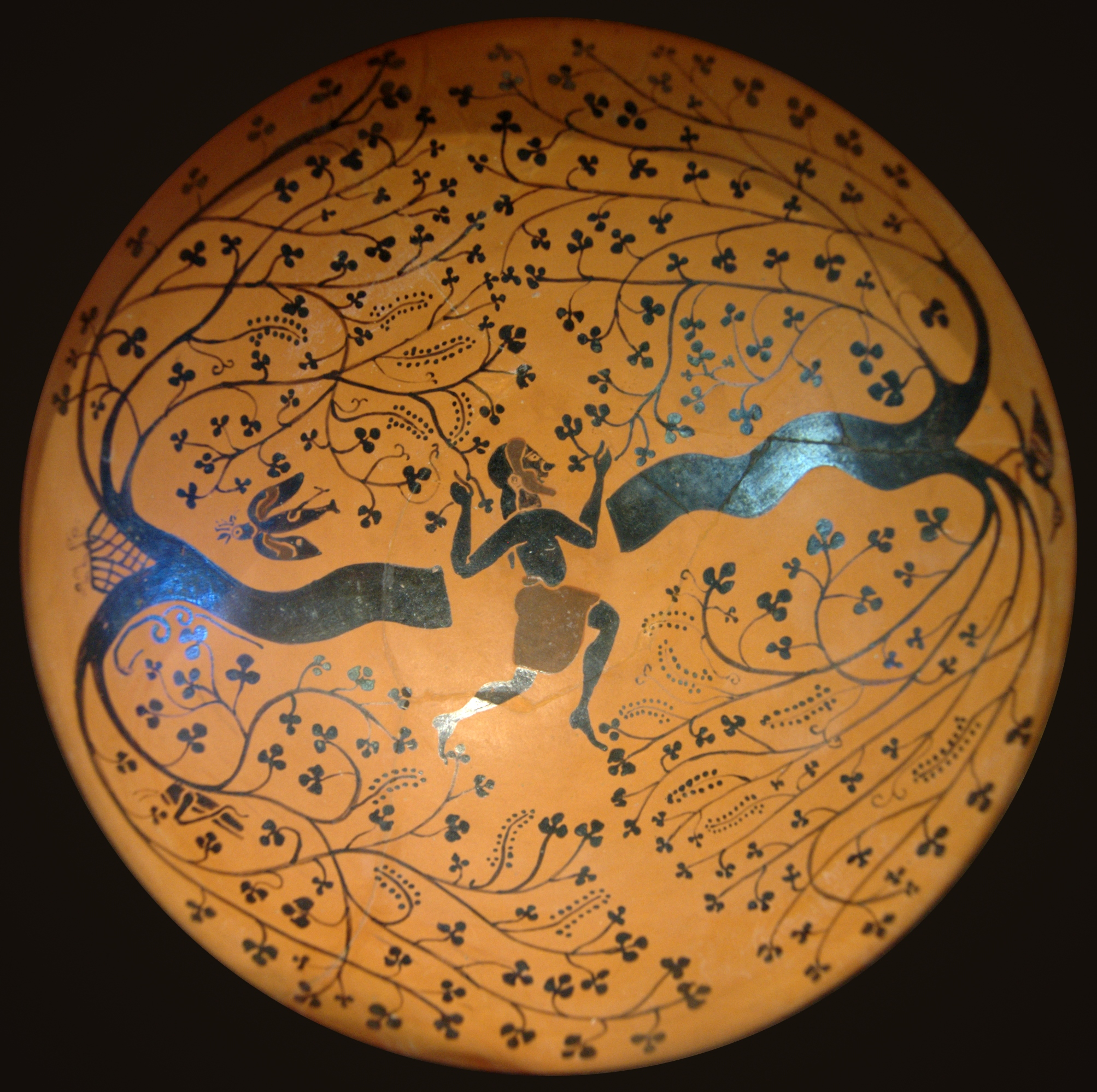
So-called “Birdcatcher Cup“, Ionian kylix, circa 550 BC. Paros: Louvre.

Ionia first becomes noticeable as a separate region within East Greek vase painting during the final phase of the Orientalising style, when the black-figure incision style spread from Northern Ionia throughout East Greece. In the later phase of the Wild Goat style, Northern Ionian artists imitated Corinthian vases, if rather poorly.

Ionia had been producing high quality pottery already since the 7th century BC. Since about 600 BC, the black-figure style was used to decorate all or part of vases. Apart from gradually developing local styles (e.g. at Clazomenae, Ephesos, Miletus, Chios and Samos), especially northern Ionia developed a variety of distinctive styles, the locations of which cannot be asserted at present. Perfume vessels based on the Lydian lydion shape, decorated merely with stripes, were widespread. Some of the images are highly original, such as a Scythian with a Bactrian camel, or a satyr with a ram. For some styles, the allocation to regions is highly disputed. Thus, the Northampton Group shows a strong Ionic influence but was probably produced in Italy, perhaps by Ionian immigrants.

== Bibliography ==
- Thomas Mannack: Griechische Vasenmalerei. Eine Einführung. Theiss, Stuttgart 2002, p. 81f., 90-94, 134f.. ISBN 3-8062-1743-2.
- Matthias Steinhart: Schwarzfigurige Vasenmalerei II. Ausserattisch, In: Der Neue Pauly, vol. 11, cols. 276-281
