= The Affecter =

Ancient Greek vase painter

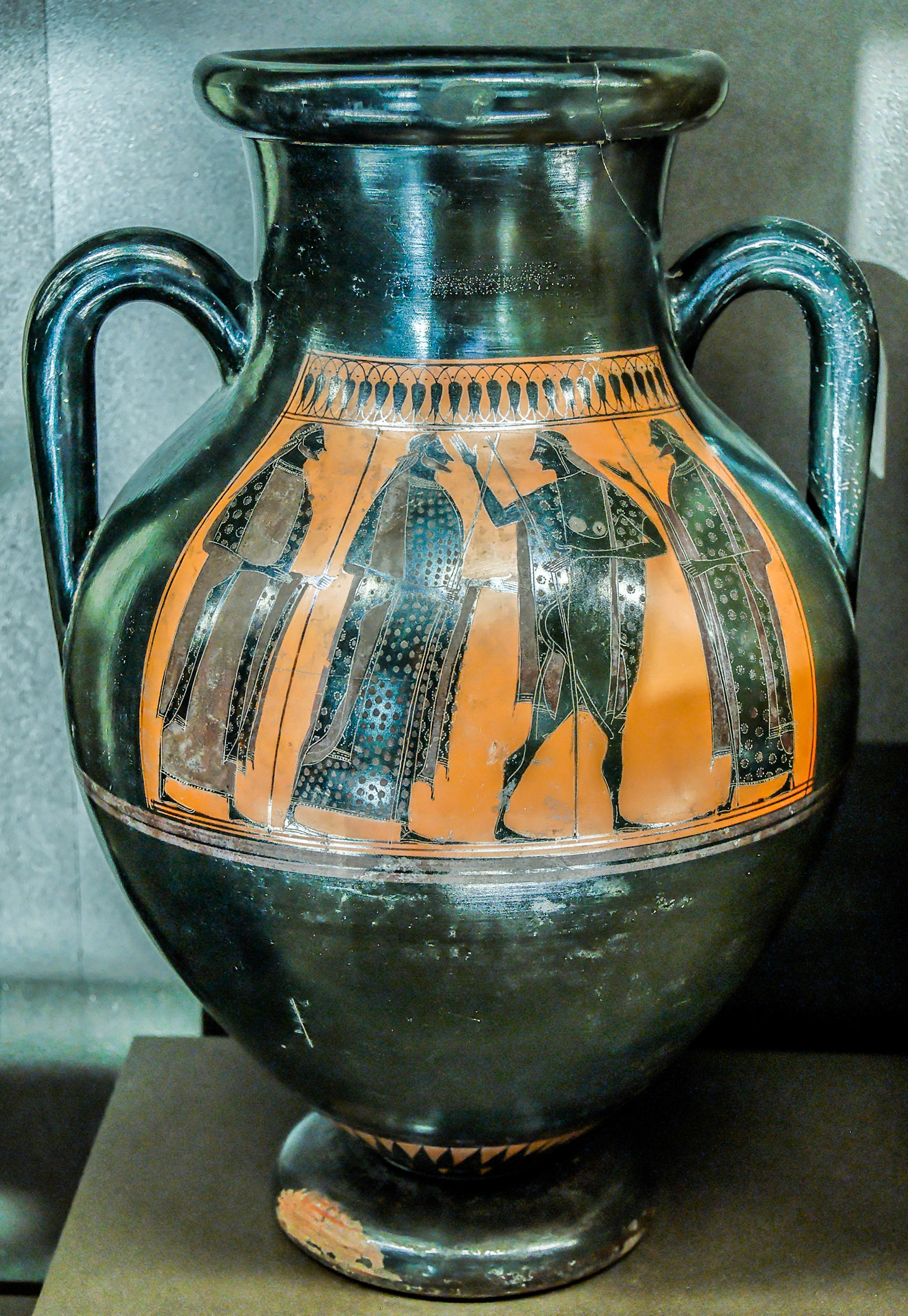
- Warrior's departure, neck-amphora by the Affecter, dated 540–530 BCE, located in the Louvre Museum
- Born: Unknown. Named for the affected style. Before 540 BCE
- Died: About or after 520 BCE
- Known for: Pottery manufacture, vase painting
- Notable work: 135 vases, mainly amphorae, manufactured in Athens
- Movement: Black-figure style
- Patrons: Mainly the Etruscan market

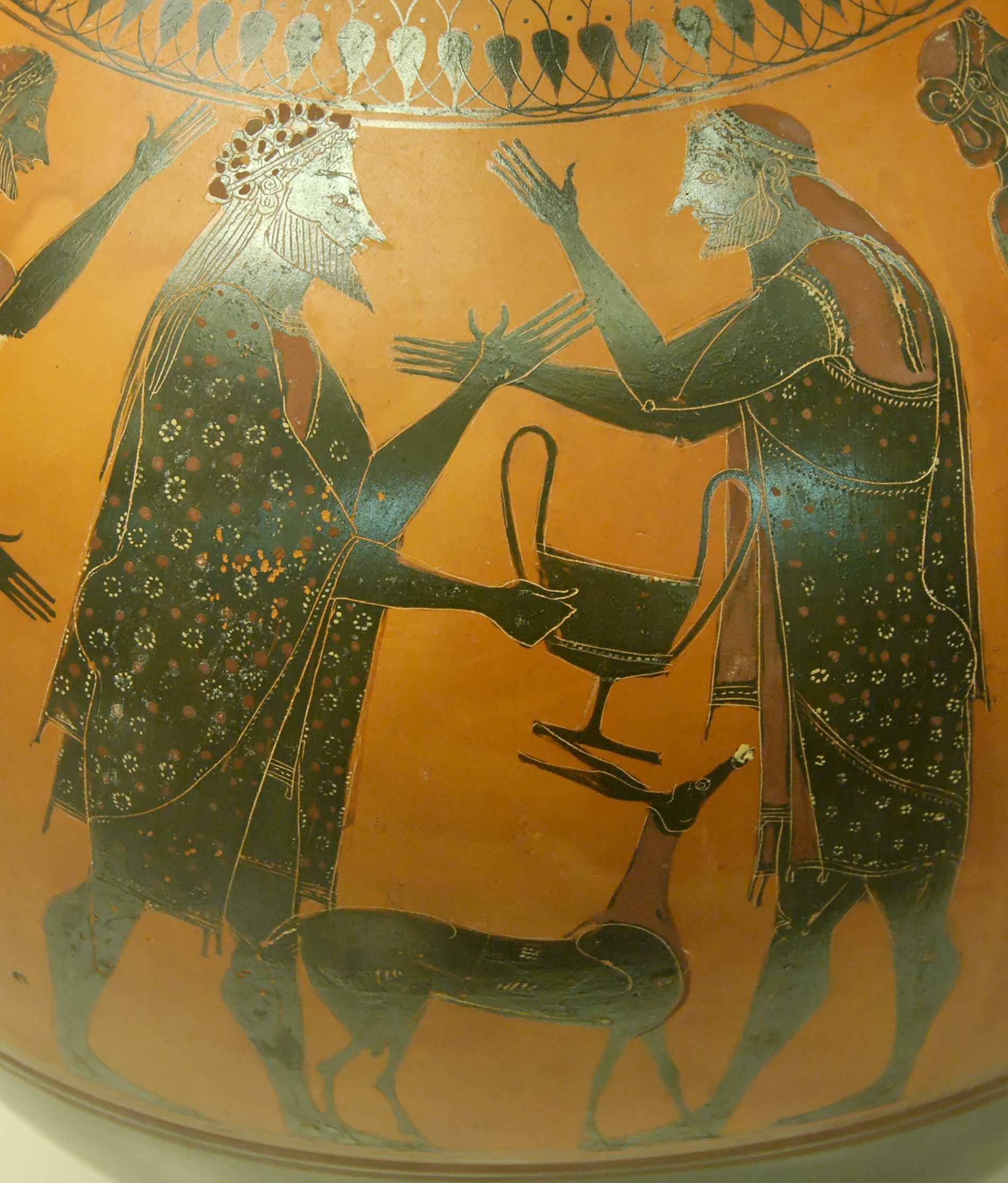
Dionysos and Ikarios on an amphora found at Vulci, British Museum (GR 1836.2–24.46)

The Affecter (or The Affected Painter) was an Attic black-figure vase painter, active in Athens around 550 to 530 BCE.

His conventional name (his real name being unknown today, as none of his works are signed) is derived from his artificial, affected style of figural painting, based on which about 135 vases can be ascribed to him. He was active as both a potter and a painter. His speciality was amphorae. He mainly painted ovoid and belly amphorae of the then newly introduced type C. Most of the 132 vases associated with him were found in Etruscan tombs and, as such, are usually well preserved.

He was interested particularly in the decorative effect of his images, composed of stylised figures in long cloaks or with affected gestures; narrative content was secondary. In his tendency to formulaic figures and multiple details, the Affecter is a successor to the Amasis Painter, from whom he may have learnt his trade. Together with the painter Elbows Out, he is considered to be a mannerist of the black-figure style.

His images often seem to reflect a surreal world. His figures usually have small heads and seemingly upholstered bodies, when clothed, or angular, pointed ones, when naked. His ornaments are very carefully drawn. He often decorated garments with coloured dots. His ornaments seem closely related to those of East Greek workshops, such as the Klazomenai Group or the Northampton Group, indicating regular cultural exchange between Attica and Ionia. A special feature of his amphorae is the replacement of the usual figural decoration on the neck by vegetal ornaments.

== See also ==
- List of Greek vase painters
- Corpus vasorum antiquorum

== Bibliography ==
- John Beazley: Attic Black-Figure Vase-Painters, Oxford 1956, p. 238–248. 690–691.
- Heide Mommsen: Der Affecter, Mainz 1975.
- John Boardman: Schwarzfigurige Vasen aus Athen. Ein Handbuch, Mainz 1977 (Forschungen zur antiken Keramik, Reihe II: Kerameus. Band 1) ISBN 3-8053-0233-9, p. 73.
- Heide Mommsen: Affecter, in: Der Neue Pauly Vol. 1, 1996, Col. 213.
