= Pontic Group =

Style of Etruscan vase painting

The Pontic Group (or Pontic vases) is a sub-style of Etruscan black-figure vase painting.

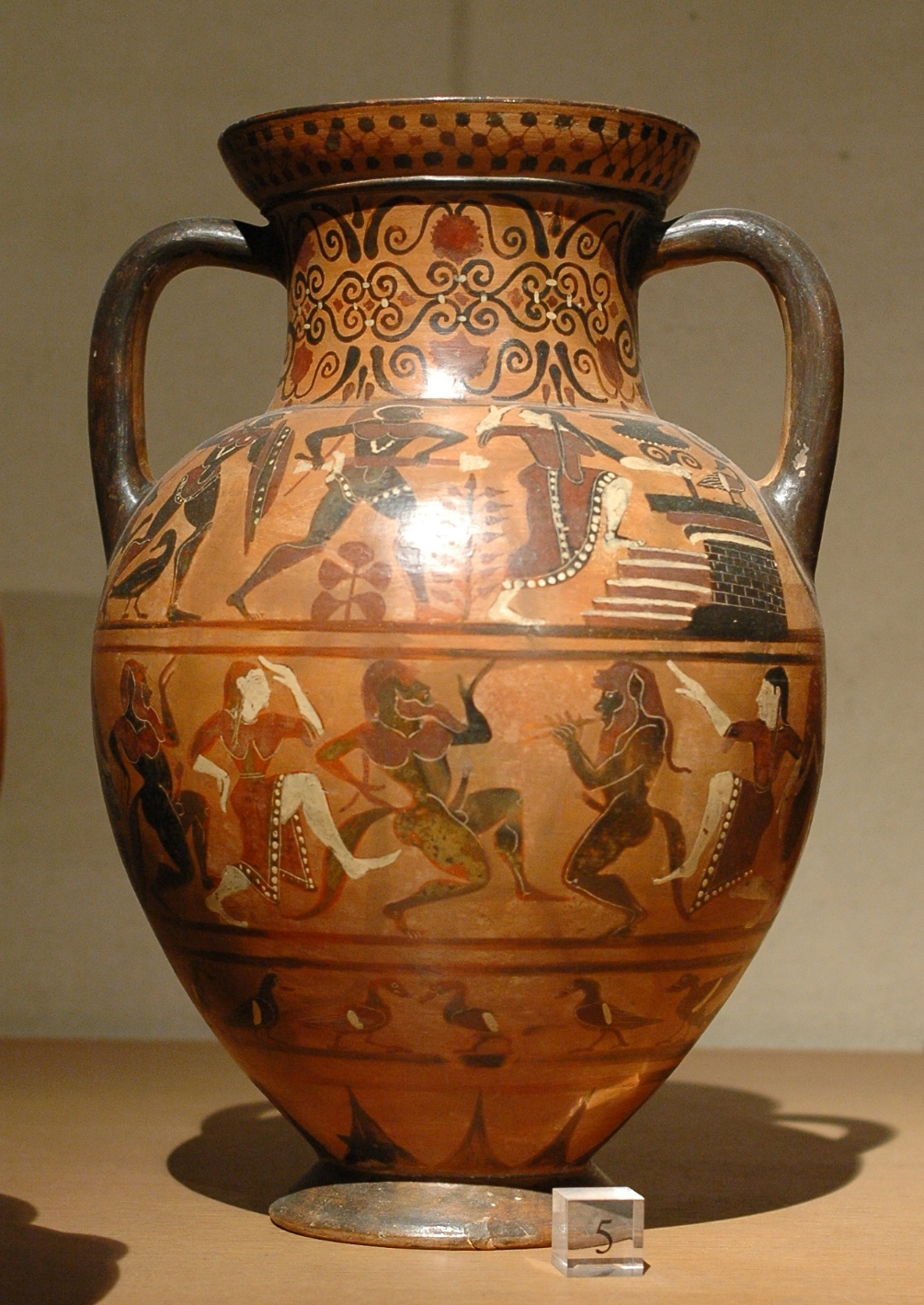
Diomedes and Polyxena, Pontic amphora by the Silenus Painter, circa 540/30 BC. Paris:Louvre.

Stylistically, Pontic vases are very closely related to Ionic vase painting. It is assumed, that the vases were produced in Etruria by craftsmen who had emigrated from Ionia. Their misleading name was coined by Georg Ferdinand Dümmler on the basis of a vase depicting an archer, whom he mistook to be a Scythian, a people who lived on the Black Sea (or Pontus). The majority of Pontic vases were found in graves at Vulci, a further considerable number at Cerveteri. The leading shape was a neck amphora of strikingly slender shape, very similar to the Tyrrhenian amphora. Other shapes include oinochai with spiral handles, dinoi, kyathoi, plates and stemmed cups, kantharoi and other shapes occur rarely. The artistic scheme of Pontic vases is uniform. Usually, they bear ornamental decoration on the neck, followed by figural motifs on the shoulder, then a further ornamental band, an animal frieze and a ring of rays. Foot, part of the neck and handles are black. The importance of the ornaments is striking. Some of the vessels bear purely ornamental decoration.

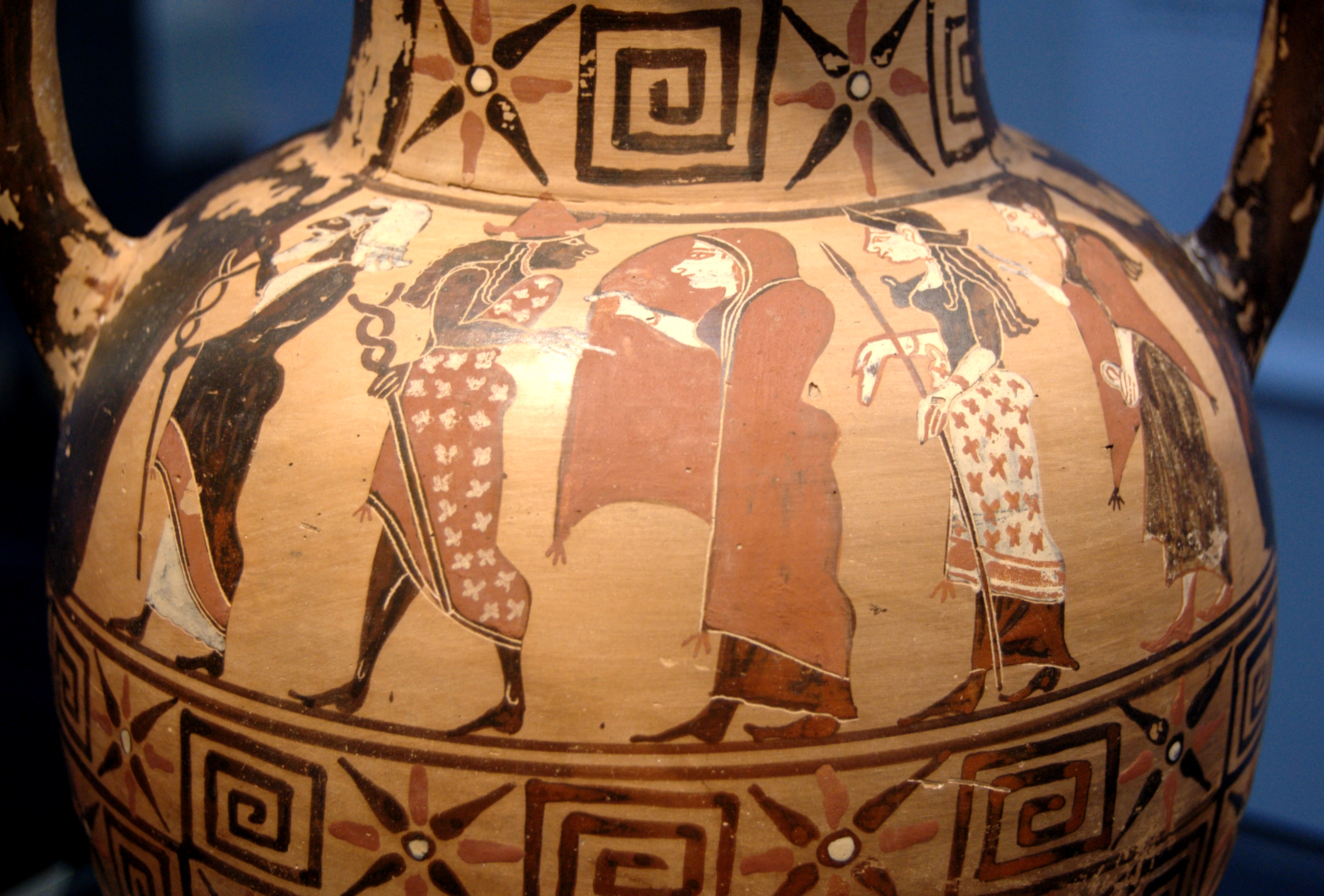
Judgement of Paris on the name vase of the Paris Painter, amphora, circa 530 BC. Munich: Staatliche Antikensammlungen.

The clay of Pontic vases is yellowy-red. The shiny slip covering them is black to brownish-red, of high quality, with a metallic sheen. Red and white paint is used copiously for figures and ornaments. Animals are usually decorated with a white stripe on the belly. Ornamentation is often executed quite carelessly. Scholars have so far recognised six workshops. The earliest and best is that of the Paris Painter. They depict mythological motifs such as a beardless Hermes, centaurs, Theseus and the Minotaur, Achilles and Troilos, satyrs, maenads and a beardless Herakles, similar to depictions common in East Greece. Scenes from the Trojan War are also common. Occasionally, mythological scenes from outside the corpus of Greek myth occur, such as Herakles fighting Juno Sospita by the Paris Painter, or a wolf-like daemon by the Titios Painter. Non-mythological scenes include komasts and horsemen. The vases are dated between 550 and 500 BC. None bear inscriptions. About 200 pieces are known as yet.

== Bibliography ==
- Pericle Ducati: Pontische Vasen. (= Forschungen zur antiken Keramik Reihe 1, Bd. 5) Keller, Berlin 1932.
- Tobias Dohrn: Die schwarzfigurigen etruskischen Vasen aus der zweiten Hälfte des sechsten Jahrhunderts. Ph.D. Köln 1936, p. 33–89. 145–151.
- John Beazley: Etruscan vase painting. Clarendon Press, Oxford 1947, p. 12.
- Enrico Paribeni: Pontici, Vasi. In: Enciclopedia dell'Arte Antica. Vol. 6, Rome 1965 Digitalisat
- Birgitte Ginge: Ceramiche Etrusche a figure nere. Materiali del Museo Archaeologico Nazionale di Tarquinia XII. Bretschneider, Rome 1987.
- Maria Antonietta Rizzo: La ceramica a figure nere. In: Marina Martelli (ed.): La ceramica degli Etruschi. Istituto Geografico de Agostini, Novara 1987, p. 31–35.
- John Boardman: Early Greek Vase Painting. Thames and Hudson, London 1998, p. 219–223.
- Matthias Steinhart: Pontische Vasenmalerei. In: Der Neue Pauly, vol. 10, cols. 138-139.
- Thomas Mannack: Griechische Vasenmalerei. Eine Einführung. Theiss, Stuttgart 2002, p. 133 ISBN 3-8062-1743-2.
