= Tityos Painter =

6th-century BC Etruscan vase painter

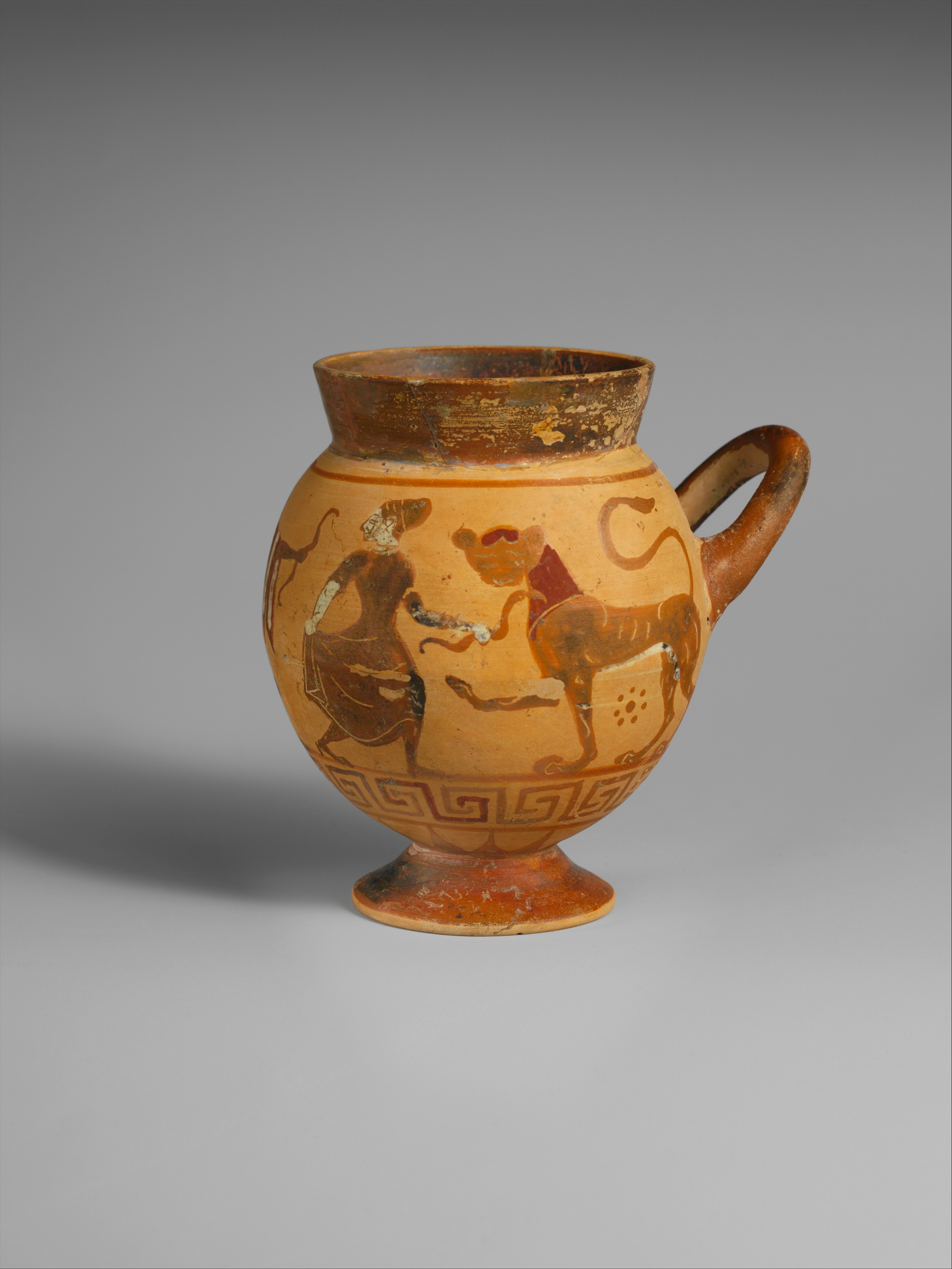
Terracotta cup by the Tityos Painter

Tityos Painter (also Titios Painter) is the name given by modern scholarship to an Etruscan vase painter of the black-figure style. His real name is not known. His activity is dated to the third quarter of the sixth century BC.

About 40 works by the Tityos Painter are known, including amphorae, jugs, kyathoi, cups and plates. His name is derived from his name vase, depicting Apollo and Artemis killing Tityos. Many of his vases bear only animal friezes, but he also had a special interest in Herakles and his deeds. Most of his vase paintings make copious use of added colour. His figures are usually depicted in dynamic poses. Besides the Paris Painter, who exerted a strong influence on him, the Tityos Painter is considered the most important representative of the Pontic Group of vase painters.

== Bibliography ==
- Lise Hannestad: The Followers of the Paris Painter, Munksgaard, Copenhagen 1976
- Matthias Steinhart: Tityos painter, The New Pauly. Volume 12/1, Metzler, Stuttgart 2002, ISBN 3-476-01482-7, p. 635.
