= Etruscan vase painting =

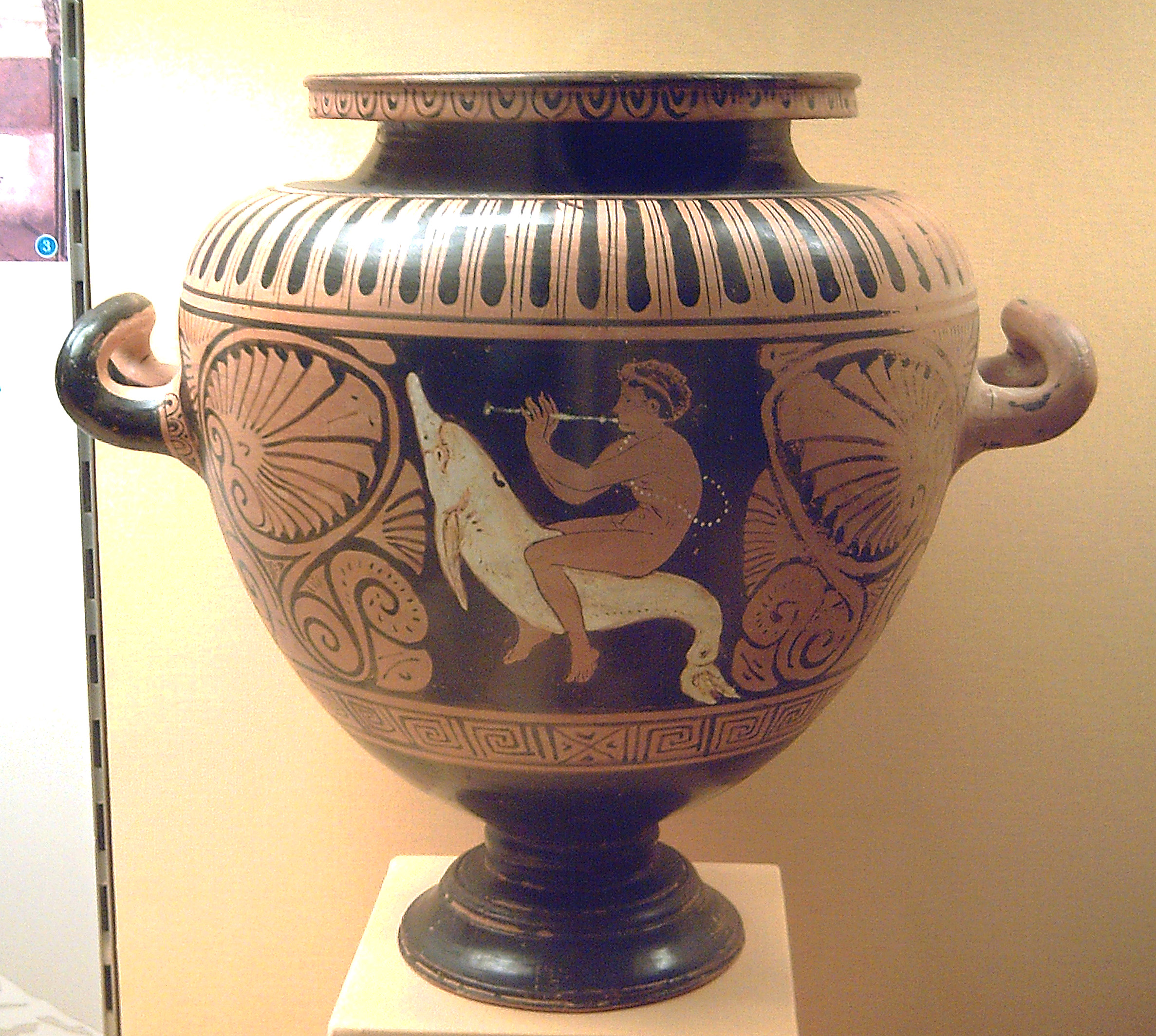
A youth mounted on a dolphin and playing the flute; stamnos, circa 360/340 BC

Etruscan vase painting was produced from the 7th through the 4th centuries BCE, and is a major element in Etruscan art. It was strongly influenced by Greek vase painting, and followed the main stylistic trends of the period. Besides being producers in their own right, the Etruscans were the main export market for Greek pottery outside Greece, and some Greek painters probably moved to Etruria, where richly decorated vases were a standard element of grave inventories.

== Black-figure vase painting ==
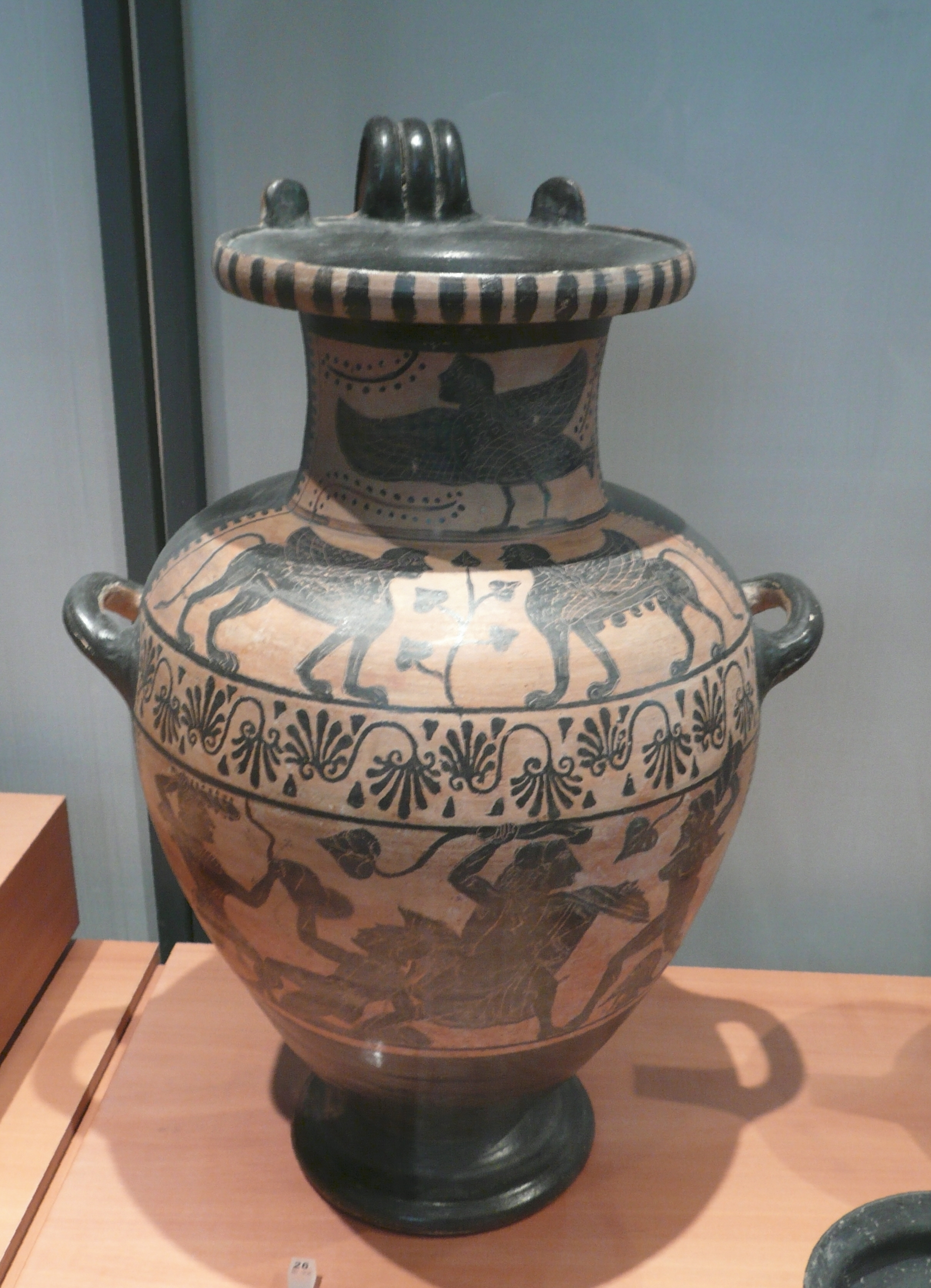
Etruscan black-figure hydria, early 5th century BC

The local production of Etruscan vases probably began in the 7th century BC. Initially, the vases followed examples of black-figure vase painting from Corinth and East Greece. It is assumed that in the earliest phase, vases were produced mainly by immigrants from Greece. The first major style was so-called Pontic vase painting. This was followed between 530 and 500 BC by the Micali Painter and his workshop. They mainly produced amphorae, hydriai and jugs. Depictions included komasts, symposia and animal friezes. Mythological motifs occur more rarely, but are already created with great care. By this time, Etruscan vase painting had begun to take its main influence from Attic vase painting. The black-figure style ended about 480 BC. In its final phase, it had developed a tendency toward mannerism and a sloppy silhouette style of drawing.

== Red-figure vase painting ==
An imitative adoption of the red-figure technique only developed in Etruria around 490 BC, nearly half a century after that style had been invented in Greece. Early produce is described as pseudo-red-figure Etruscan vase painting, due to its differing technique. Only by the end of the 5th century was the true red-figure technique introduced to Etruria. For both pseudo- and true red-figure, numerous painters, workshops and production centres have been recognised. Vases were not just produced for the local market, but also sold to Malta, Carthage, Rome and the Ligurian coast.

=== Pseudo-red-figure vase painting ===
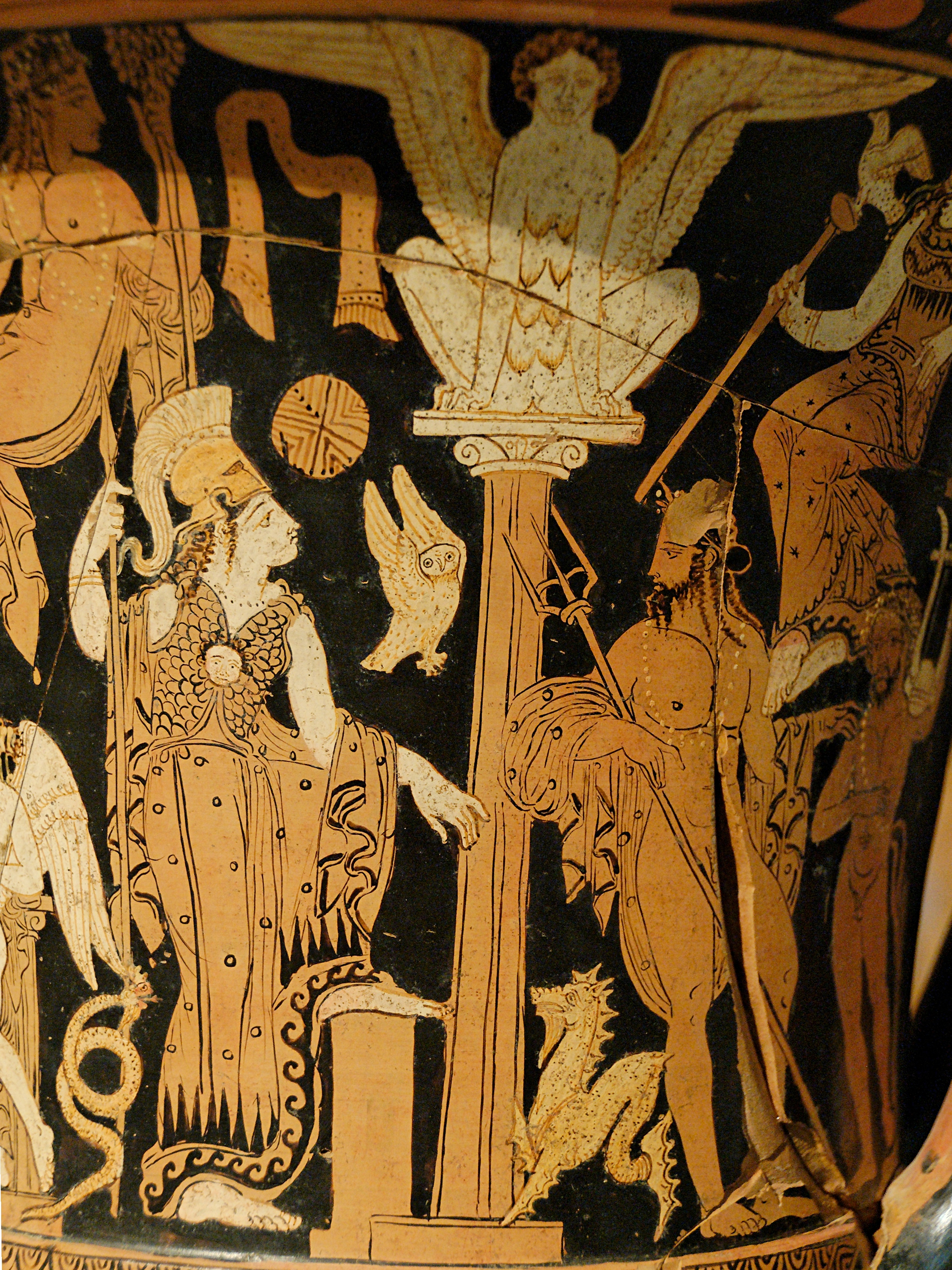
Athena and Poseidon on a volute krater by the Nazzano Painters, circa 360 BC

Early vessels of this style merely imitated the red-figure technique. As on some early Attic vases, this was achieved by covering the whole vase body in black shiny slip, then adding figures on top, using paints that would oxidise into red or white during firing. In true red-figure, the red areas were left free of slip. In pseudo-red-figure, internal details were marked by incision, similar to the usual practice in black-figure vase painting, rather than painted on, as in true red-figure. Important representatives of this style were the Praxias Painter and other masters of his workshop, which was located at Vulci. Despite their extensive knowledge of Greek mythology and iconography - not always executed perfectly - there is no evidence that these masters were Greek immigrants. An exception is the Praxias Painter himself: since four of his vases bear painted inscriptions in Greek, he may have been of Greek origin.

In Etruria, the pseudo-red-figure style was not just an early phenomenon, as it had been in Athens. Especially in the 4th century BC, some workshops specialised in this technique, although true red-figure was widespread in Etruscan workshops at the same time. Examples include the workshops of the Sokra Group and the Phantom Group. The somewhat older Sokra Group had a preference for cups with interior images from Greek mythology, sometimes also with Etruscan motifs. The Phantom Group mostly painted cloaked figures in combination with compositions of plant or palmette patterns. The workshops of both groups are supposed to have been located in Caere, Falerii, and Tarquinia. The Phantom Group produced its wares until the early 3rd century BC. Changing tastes on the buyers' part spelled the end not just of true red-figure but also of this style.

=== Red-figure vase painting ===
Only towards the end of the 5th century was the true red-figure technique, with the figures as reserved areas remaining in the actual clay colour, introduced to Etruria. The first such workshops were developed in Vulci and Falerii, but were also produced for the surrounding areas. The original workshops were probably founded by Attic masters, but the early vessels also already display a South Italian influence. These workshops dominated the Etruscan market until the 4th century BC. Large and medium format vessels like kraters and jugs were mostly decorated with mythological scenes. During the course of the century, the production of Falerii began to outclass that of Vulci in terms of quantity. New centres of production developed in Chiusi and Orvieto. Chiusi became especially important through the Tondo Group, which produced drinking cups with mostly dionysiac motifs on the inside. In the second half of the century, production moved to Volterra. Here, especially a certain type of craters, the kelebes were produced and initially painted very elaborately.

In the second half of the 4th century BC, mythological themes disappeared from the repertoire of Etruscan vase painters. They were replaced with women's heads and figural depictions of not more than two persons. Instead, the vase bodies were now mostly covered with ornamental and floral motifs. Larger compositions now only occurred in exceptional cases, such as the amazonomachy on a krater by the Hague Funnel Group Painter. While initially still substantial, the production at Falerii lost its dominant role to the newly founded production centre at Caere. The Caere workshops were probably founded by masters from Falerii; they lacked a separate tradition but became the main centre of red-figure vase production in Etruria. Its standard repertoire included simply painted oinochoai, lekythoi and drinking cups (e.g. by the Torcop Group), and small plates (Genucuilia Group). By the end of the 4th century, a change in consumer tastes led to a shift towards the production of black-glazed ware, which marked the end of red-figure vase production in Etruria.

== Bibliography ==
- Matthias Steinhart: Schwarzfigurige Vasenmalerei II. Ausserattisch. In: Der Neue Pauly, vol. 11, cols. 276-281.
