= Samian vase painting =

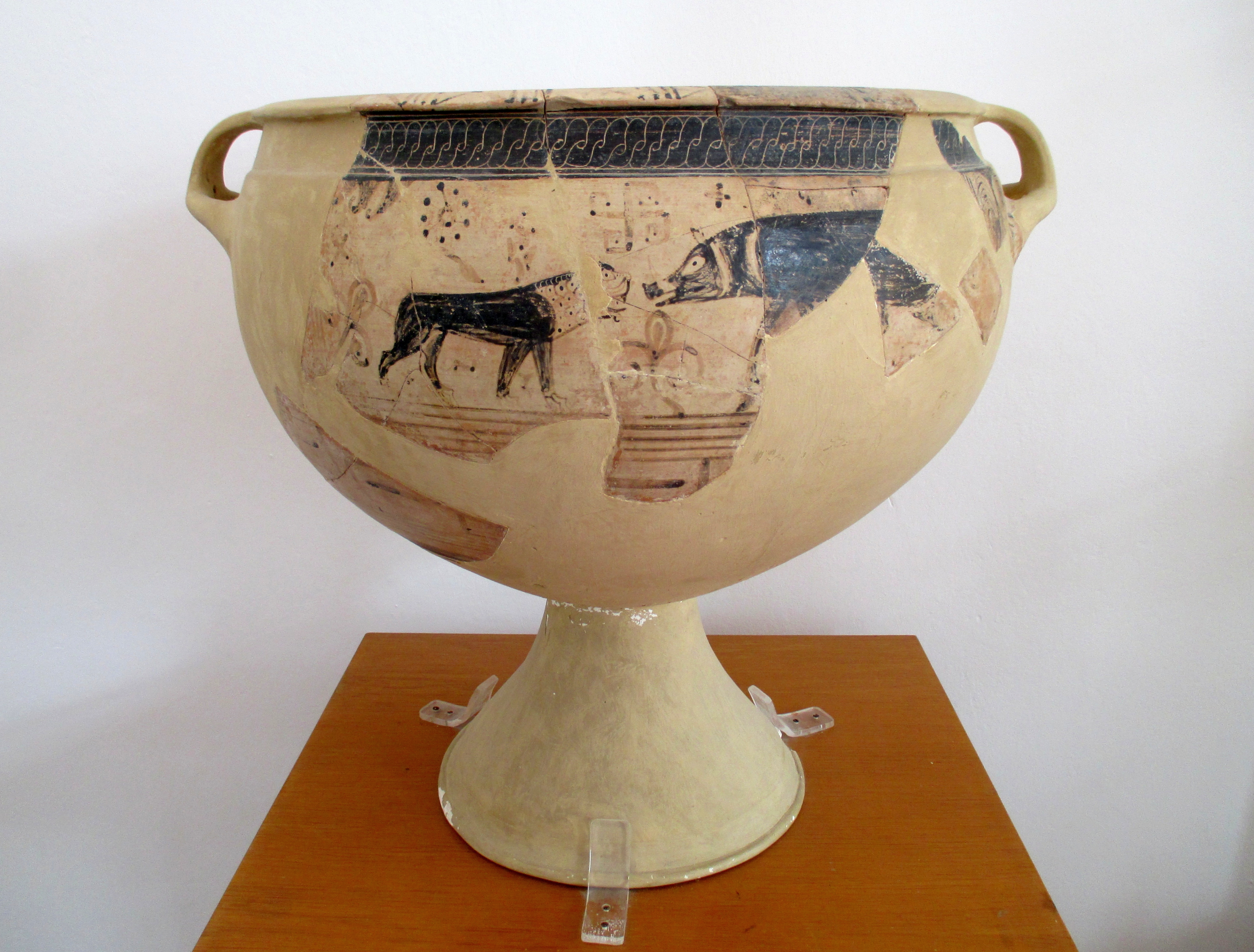
Samian krater (7th century BC); Archaeological Museum of Samos

Samian vase painting was a regional style of ancient Greek vase painting; it formed part of East Greek vase painting.

Vases were produced on Samos since the Geometric period. At the Heraion of Samos, many Geometric vases were discovered, including high-footed kraters, kantharoi, kotyles, skyphoi and round-mouthed oinochoai. Details such as the diagonally hatched meanders and four-leafed starts betray an Attic influence. Images of birds are very common, as are horses, on Samos typically with a long main, reaching as far as the middle of the back. In one case, a prosthesis is depicted.

Around 560/550 BC, Samian potters began to produce black-figure vessels of types adopted from Attic vase painting. These types are Little-master cups and face-shaped kantharoi. The painting is precise and decorative. Besides Miletus and Rhodes, Samos was one of the main production centres of vases in the Wild Goat style.

== Bibliography ==
- Thomas Mannack: Griechische Vasenmalerei. Eine Einführung. Theiss, Stuttgart 2002, p. 81f., 90-94, 134f.. ISBN 3-8062-1743-2.
- Matthias Steinhart: Schwarzfigurige Vasenmalerei II. Ausserattisch. In: Der Neue Pauly, vol. 11, cols. 276-281.
