= Lydion =

Ancient Greek vase shape

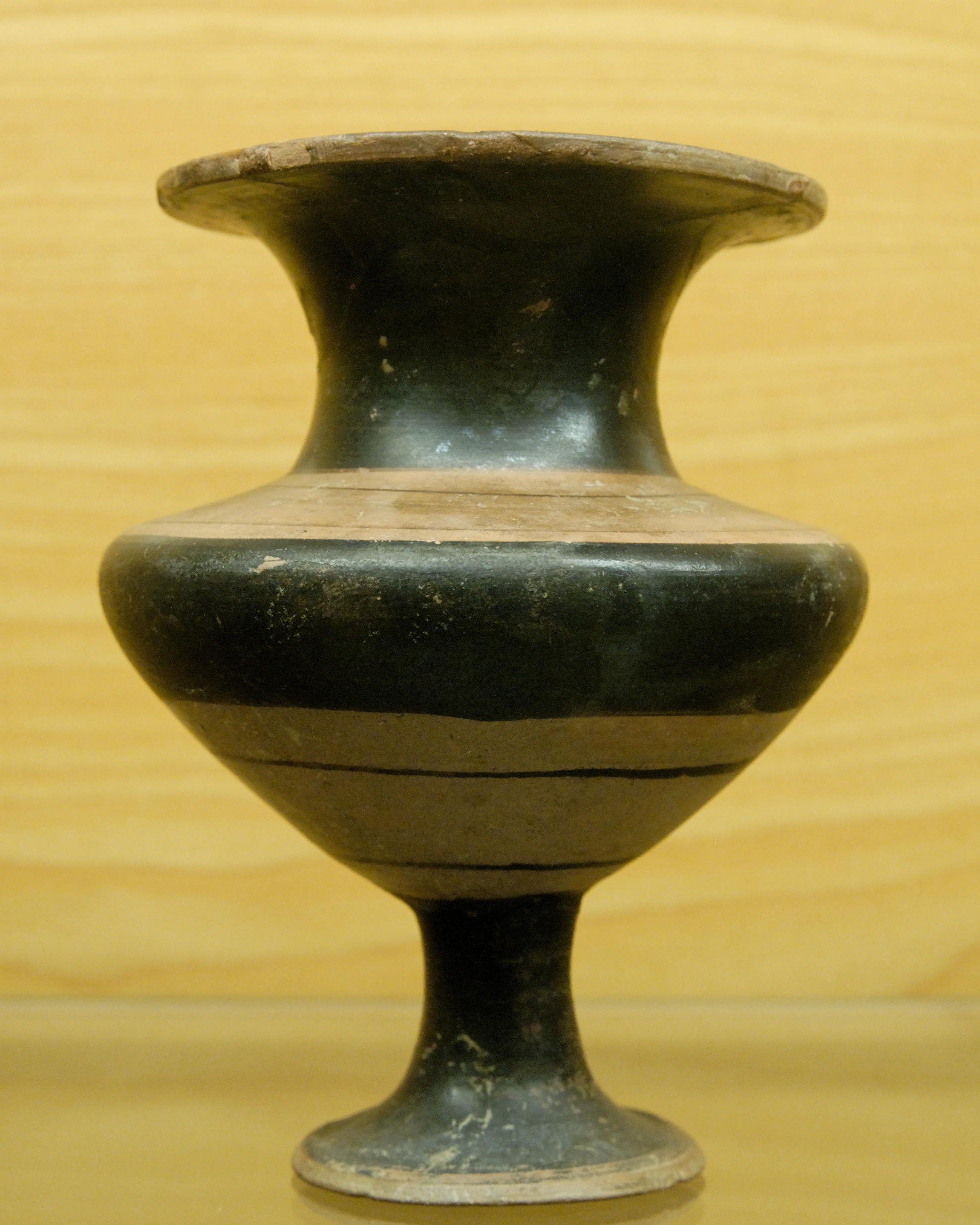
Ionic-black-figure lydion with stripe decoration, 2nd half, 6th century BC. Found at Gela, now Museo archeologico regionale di Palermo.

The lydion (Greek λύδιον; plural lydia) was an ancient Greek vase shape. The shape may have been of Egyptian derivation.

As indicated by its name, the lydion originated in Lydia, but was also adopted by potters in Greece. A small spherical perfume container, lacking handles, it was especially popular in East Greece. The vessel stood on a narrow, relatively high foot, cylindrical or conical in shape. The neck could be of varying length; it met the body at an acute angle. The lip was horizontal. Usually, the lydion was decorated with stripes. In Athens, it was only produced rarely; figural decoration was even rarer.

== Bibliography ==
- Wolfgang Schiering: Die griechischen Tongefässe. Gestalt, Bestimmung und Formenwandel. 2. edn. Mann, Berlin 1983, S. 151 ISBN 3-7861-1325-4 (Gebr.-Mann-Studio-Reihe).
