= Northampton Group =

Stylistic group of ancient Greek vases

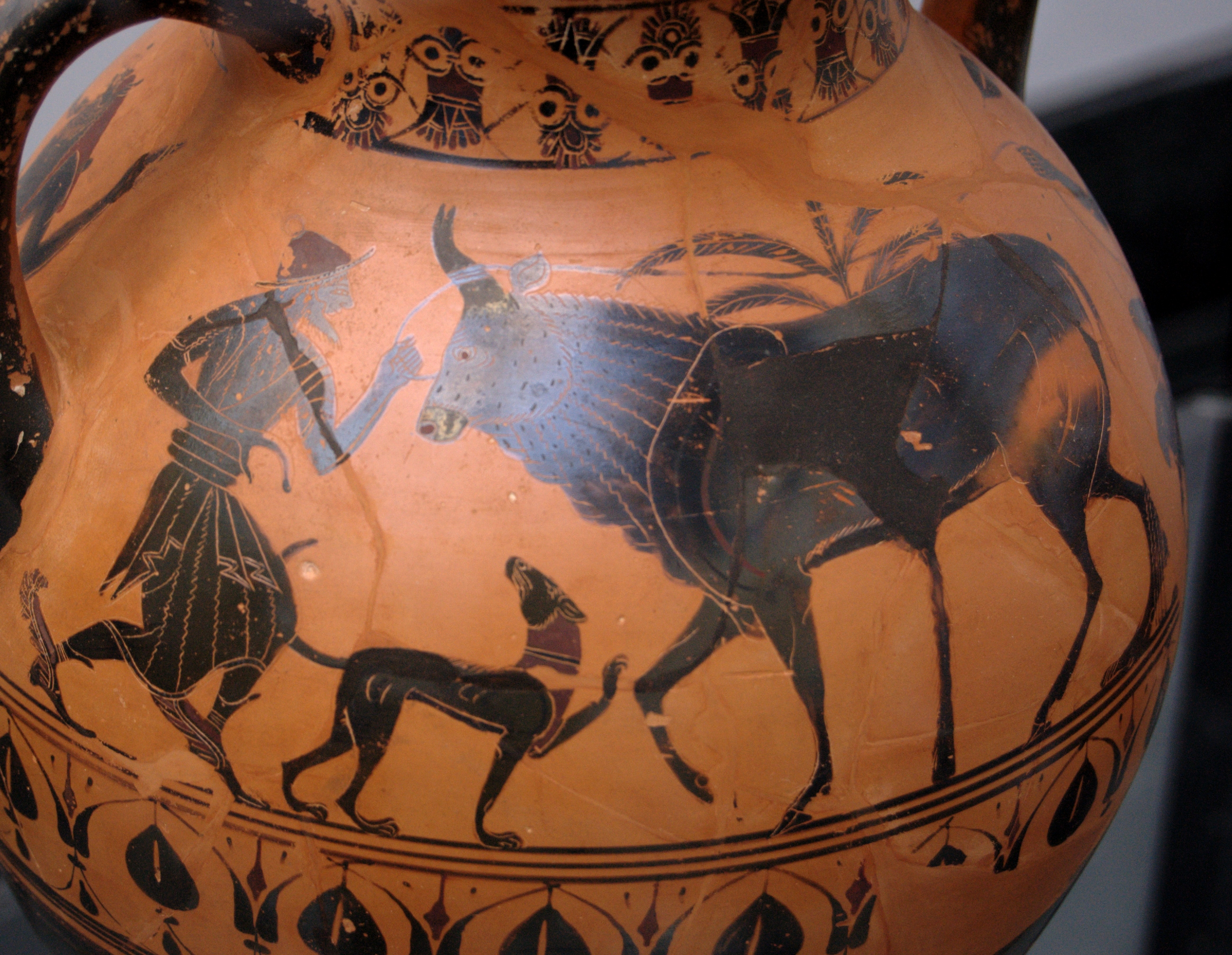
Belly amphora by the Northampton Group. Shoulder A: liberation of Io (in the shape of a cow) by Hermes. Munich: Staatliche Antikensammlungen.

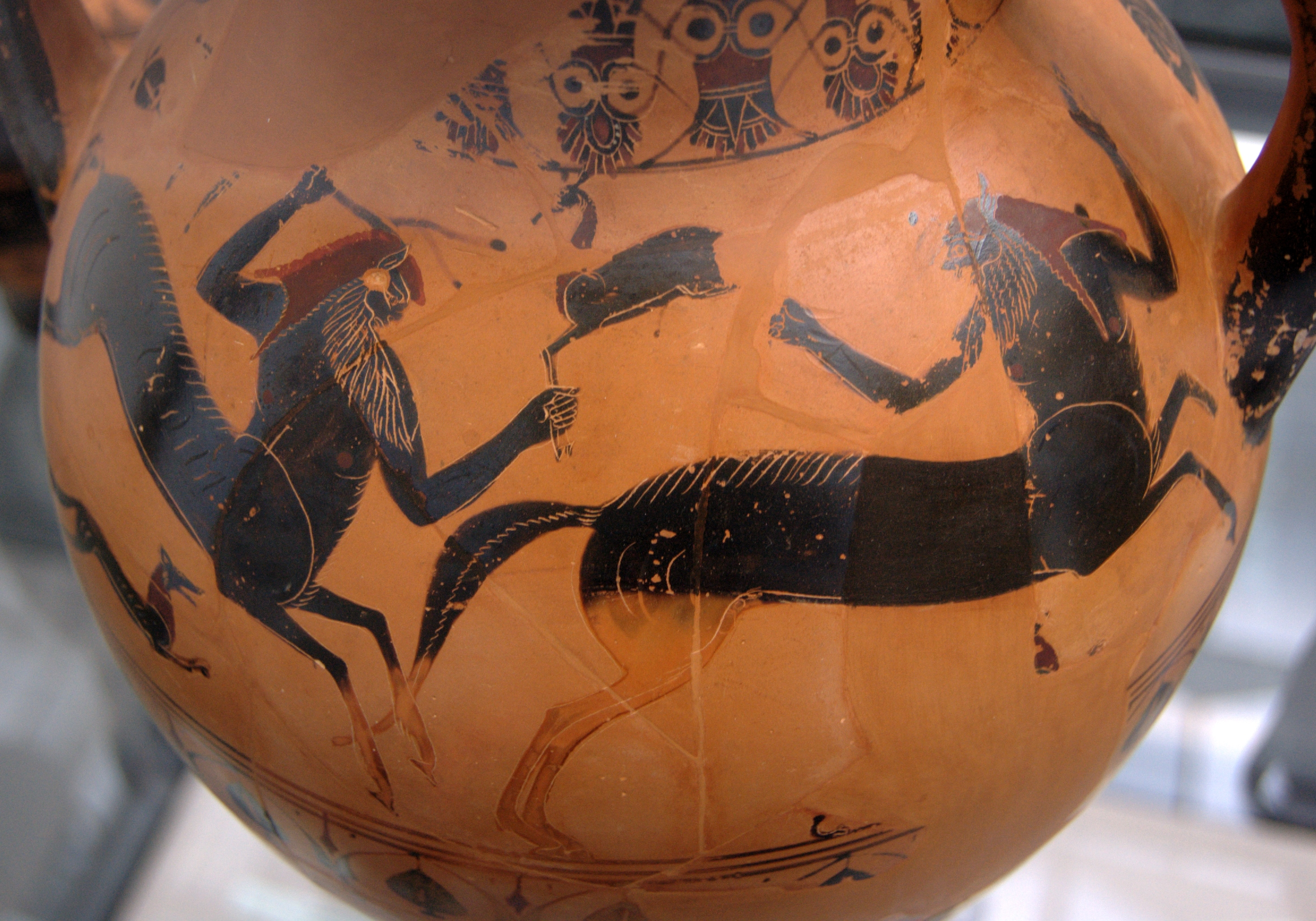
Belly amphora in Munich, Side B: centaurs.

The Northampton Group was a stylistic group of ancient Greek amphorae in the black-figure style.

With the exception of a single belly amphora, the vases of the Northampton Group are exclusively neck amphorae. Stylistically, they are very close to North Ionian vase painting. However, they were probably not produced in Ionia, but in Italy (Etruria). They date to about 540 BC. The vases by the Northampton Group are products of very high quality. They feature rich ornamental decoration and sometimes interesting imagery, such as a mounted prince and men mounted on cranes. They are stylistically closely related to the Campana dinoi. The clay of Northampton Group vases is similar to that of Caeretan hydriai and shows no indication of an East Mediterranean origin.

The Group's name is derived from the Northampton Amphora, one of the most famous pieces in the collection of Spencer Compton, 2nd Marquess of Northampton, who was president of the Royal Society from 1838 to 1848. From 1820 to 1830 he had lived in Italy, where he acquired most of his collection of over 160 ancient vases, including 52 black-figure amphorae. Roughly at the same time, excavations began at the necropolis of Vulci, from where to amphorae of the group entered the Staatliche Antikensammlungen at Munich. Although Lord Northampton supported the excavations financially, it is not known whether the Northampton Amphora itself is from that site. Eduard Gerhard was the first archaeologist to describe some of the vases in Northampton's collection, while on a visit to Rome. After the Lord's return to England, the vases were placed in his residence at Castle Ashby. By the beginning of the 20th century, they were displayed publicly. In 1980, his descendants auctioned the collection off at Christie's. At the time, the Northampton Amphora was sold for 415,360 US Dollars.

== Literature ==
- Thomas Mannack: Griechische Vasenmalerei. Eine Einführung. Theiss, Stuttgart 2002, p. 132. ISBN 3-8062-1743-2.
- Matthias Steinhart: Schwarzfigurige Vasenmalerei II. Ausserattisch, In: Der Neue Pauly, vol 11, cols 276-281.
