= Wild Goat Style =

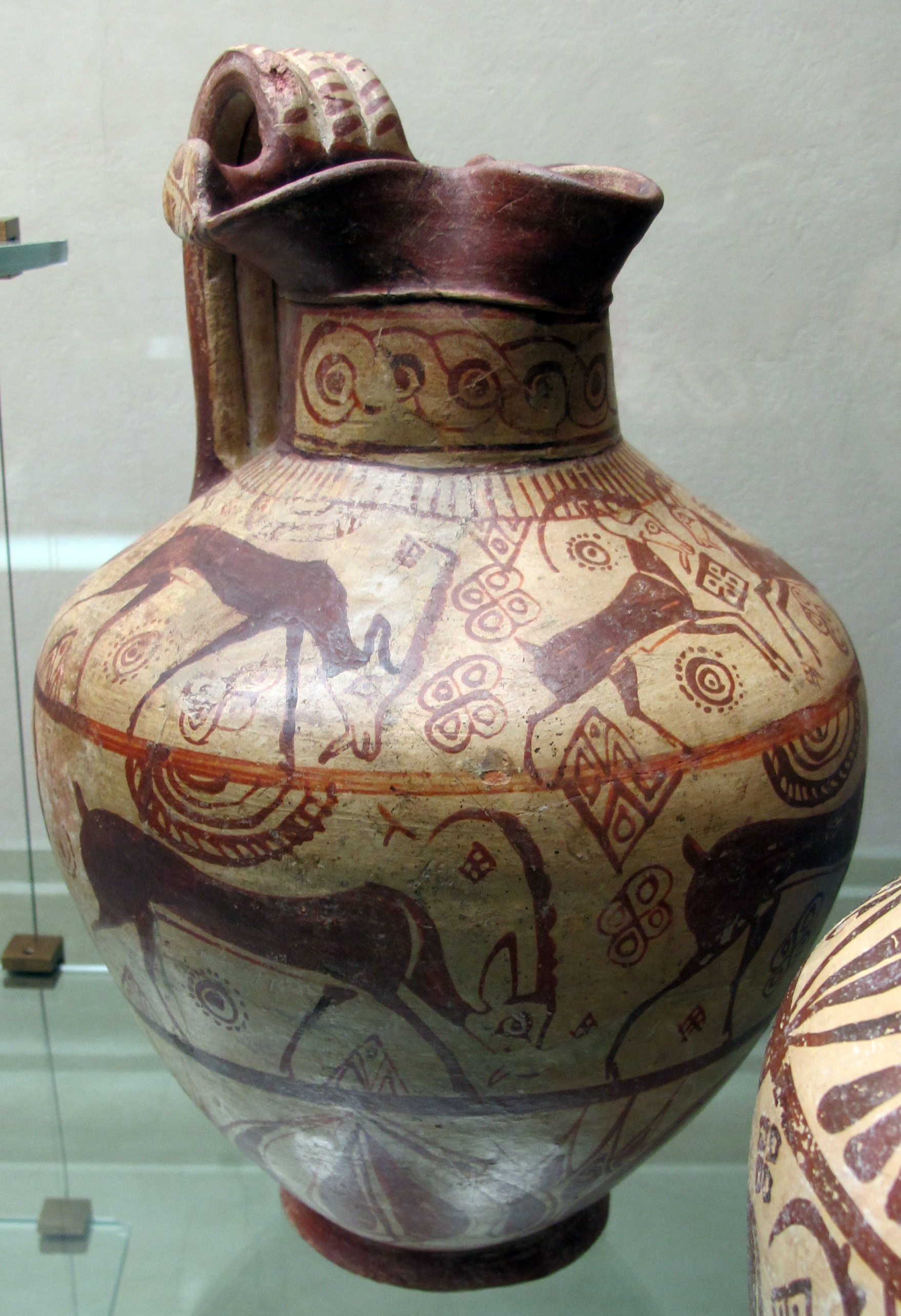
Oinochoe in Wild Goat style, with wild goats, Rhodes, c. 615–600 BCE

The Wild Goat style (variously capitalized and hyphenated) is a modern term describing vase painting produced in the east of Greece, namely the southern and eastern Ionian islands, between c. 650 to 550 BCE. Examples have been found notably at the sites in Chios, at Miletus and in Rhodes. The style owes its name to the predominant motif found on such vases: friezes of goats. The style developed the technique introduced during the Orientalizing period of rendering the heads of figures in outline by applying it to the whole of a figure. Thus where previously an image was a silhouette, the Wild Goat style allowed a greater representation of detail and marked a step forward in the progress towards naturalism.

Goats are not the only creatures depicted on such vases; in common with other Orientalizing pottery, hares, lions, hounds, griffins and sphinxes are also to be found along with favoured in-filling devices like intertwining lines and dots or a checker pattern. The variety of ornamentation makes a careful distinction of a number of phases in the development of the style possible which in turn has been used to date the founding of Greek colonies in the Levant and North Africa.

== Gallery ==
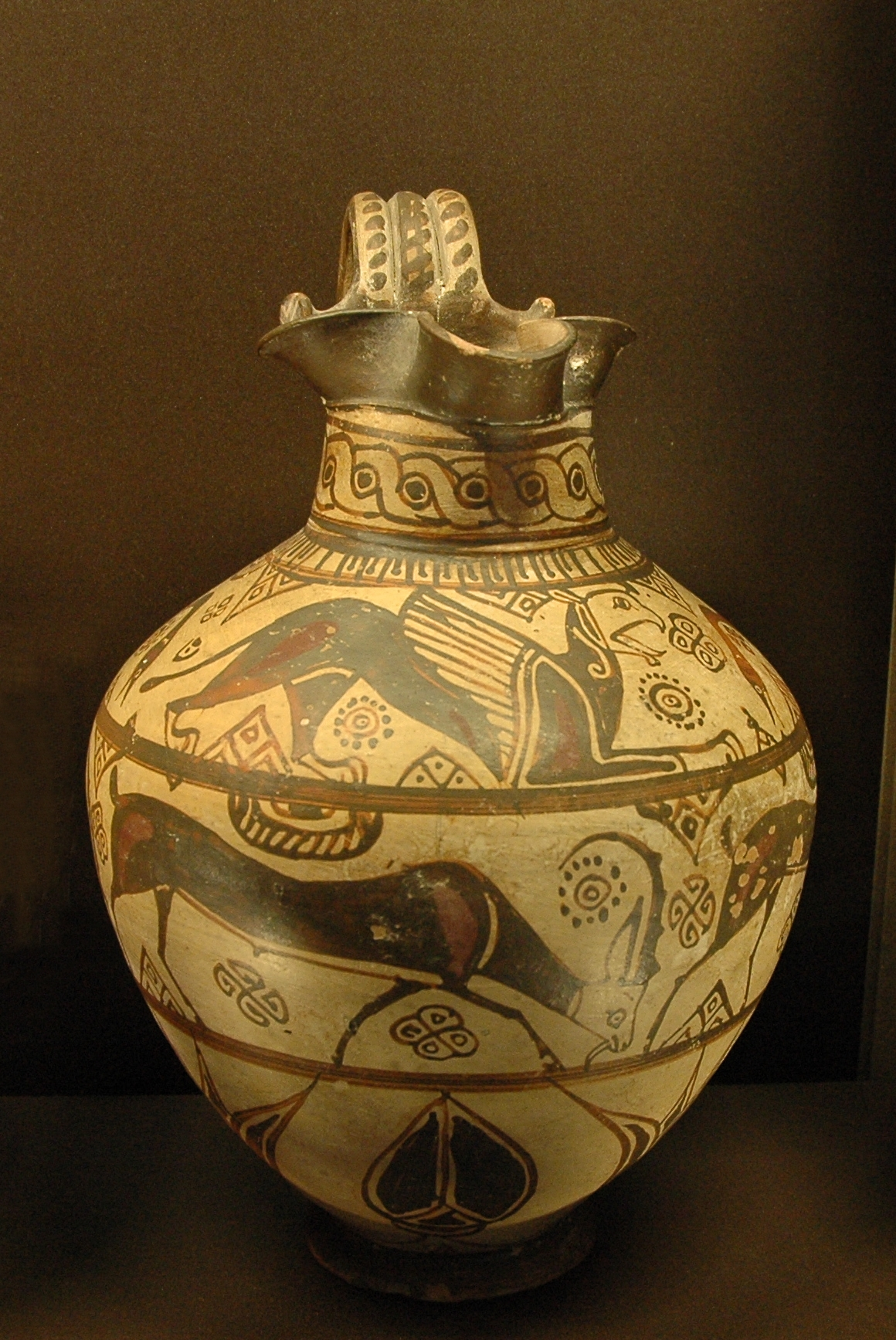
An oinochoe of the Wild Goat style. Camiros, Rhodes, c. 625 BCE (Louvre)

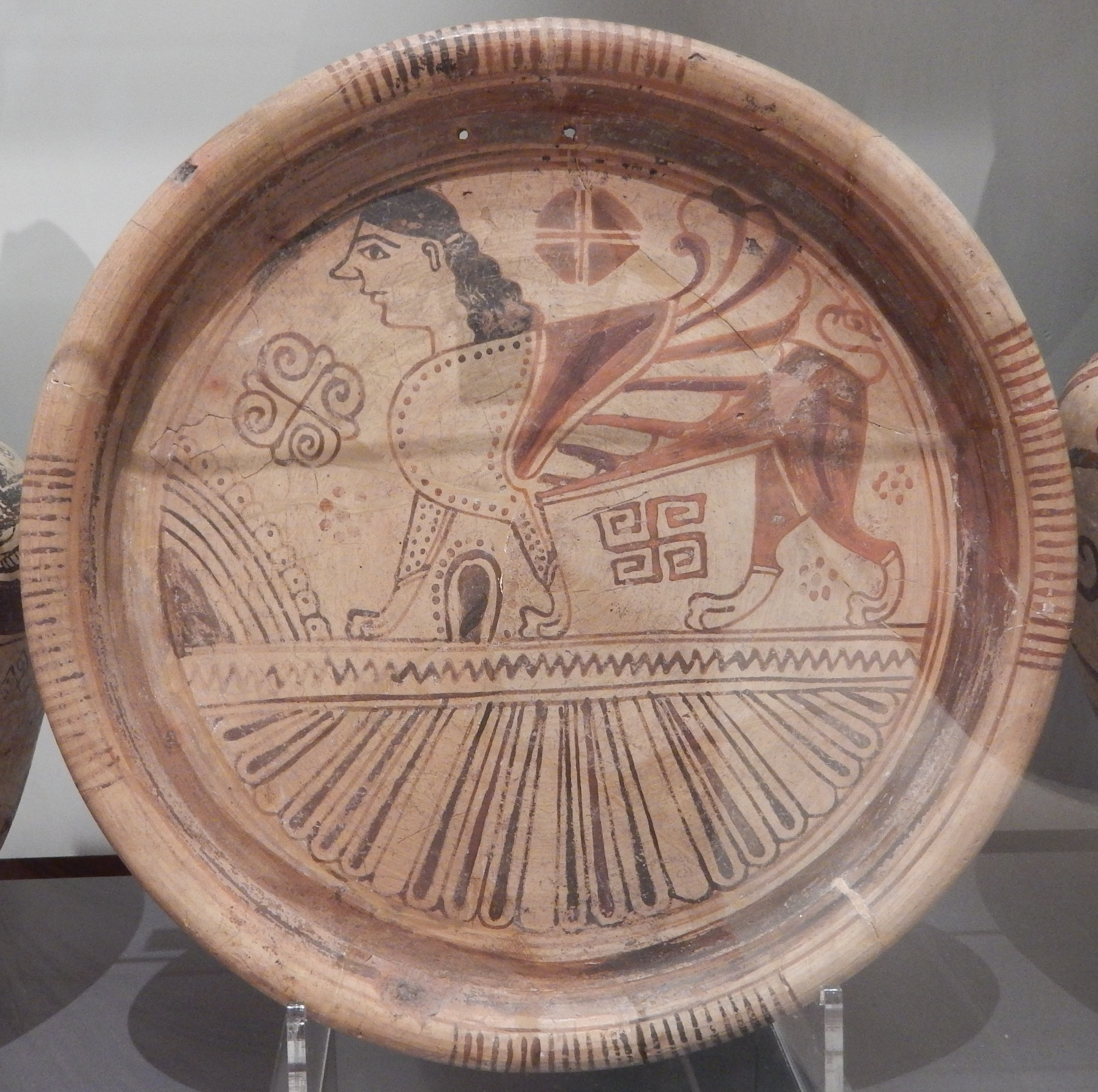
Plate in the Wild Goat style, showing a sphinx with geometric and floral motifs above a zone of petals

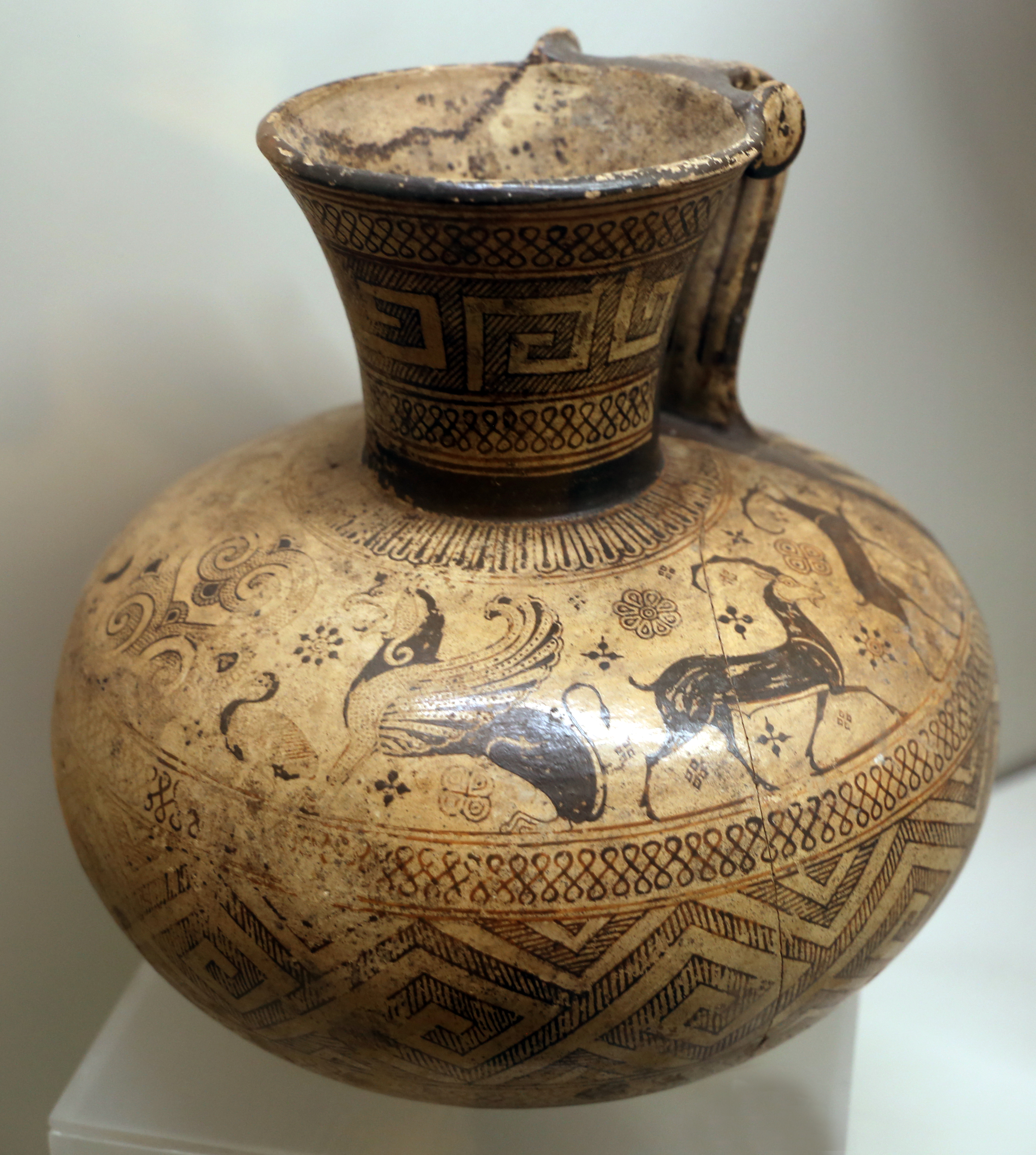
Oinochoe in the Wild Goat style. National Etruscan Museum
