= Phanias =

Phanias may refer to:

- A historic person:
  - Phanias of Eresus in Lesbos, Greek philosopher
  - Phanias (Stoic philosopher), a Stoic philosopher, disciple of Posidonius
  - Phanias (Athenian Commander), an Athenian naval commander during the Corinthian War
- Phanias (spider), a genus of jumping spiders
