= Eteonicus =

Spartan admiral during the Peloponesian and Corinthian Wars

Eteonicus (Ancient Greek: Ἐτεόνικος) was a Spartan commander during the Peloponesian and Corinthian Wars. He participated in many key engagements, held important commands and is mentioned multiple times by Thucydides, Xenophon and Diodorus Siculus. His appearance in the record, however, is mostly episodic, with his roles not being particularly influential.

== Peloponnesian War ==
Eteonicus first appears on the historical stage when serving under Astyochus in a campaign around Chios sometime during 413 BC – 412 BC without any notable accomplishments.

In 412 BC – 411 BC he served as a Spartan governor of Thasos (and potentially Iasos) from where he was expelled along with the pro-Spartan faction. The setback was thought to be the result of treachery on the part of a fellow Spartan, Pasippidas, who was subsequently exiled from Sparta.

=== Battle of Arginusae and Immediate Aftermath ===
In 406 BC, Spartan forces were blockading the Athenian admiral Conon in Mitylene prompting Athens to send a relief force. The Spartan admiral Callicratidas left Eteonicus blockading Conon with 50 ships and took the remaining 120 ships against the Athenians. The two fleets met at Arginusae just off the Island of Lesbos. The Spartan fleet was completely destroyed and Callicratidas killed. Eteonicus received the news of the defeat and withdrew to Chios. In the meantime, the Athenians divided their fleet after Arginusae. The main force was sent after Eteonicus while a smaller force was dispatched to pick up the survivors of the 25 ships lost in the battle. However, a bad storm prevented both endeavours. Eteonicus got away and 1000 – 5000 shipwrecked Athenian soldiers drowned leading to a political fire-storm in Athens.

Eteonicus experienced further difficulties while in Chios. As winter approached and he had no money to pay his troops they were unable to provide sufficient food and shelter for themselves. This led to a conspiracy aimed at sacking Chios which was an allied state. The conspirators agreed to tie reeds to their arms in order to recognize each other. Eteonicus feared the attack would result in significant damage to Sparta's reputation as well as damage the broader Spartan alliance. He was forced to issue the risky order to execute any of his own men seen with a reed tied around his arm. The gambit worked and the crisis was averted. Soon thereafter, Lysander arrived in Ephesus to take overall command in Ionia and Eteonicus joined him there with his forces.

=== Battle of Aegospotami ===
Two years later, in 404 BC Eteonicus played an important role in the pivotal battle of Aegospotami that effectively ended the Peloponnesian War. There are varying accounts of the battle. However, the accounts all agree on the total destruction of the Athenian fleet by Lysander, leading directly to the surrender of Athens. Much of the Athenian fleet was destroyed on the beach while the crews were scattered. Eteonicus led the Spartan land forces that fought on the beach.

After the battle Lysander swept the Athenians from power throughout much of their empire. As part of that campaign, Eteonicus was sent by Lysander with 10 triremes to overthrow Athenian power in the north which he was successful in doing.

== Encounter with the "Ten Thousand" ==
Eteonicus also has a small part in the story of the famous Ten Thousand Greek mercenaries who had marched into Persia to fight for Cyrus the Younger and were stranded there upon his death at the Battle of Cunaxa. Upon their return to Ionia, Pharnabazus, the Persian satrap was worried about the Greek army ravaging his lands. He asked his Spartan allies to help remove the army from his territories. In response, Anaxibius, the Spartan general, tricked Xenophon, the commander of the Ten Thousand, into transporting his army across to Byzantium with a promise of employment. Once there, the Ten Thousand were stranded and ordered to march into Thrace and fend for themselves. Refusing to go, the soldiers seized Byzantium which was held for Anaxibius by Eteonicus. Eteonicus was forced to take refuge in the citadel. However, Xenophon was able to persuade his troops of the folly inherent in defying Sparta at a time when the Spartans were dominating the Greek world in the aftermath of the Peloponnesian War. The remnants of the Ten Thousand thereupon retired peacefully from Byzantium.

== Corinthian War ==
In 388 BC, with the Corinthian war already several years old, Eteonicus was the Spartan governor of Aegina. Under orders from Sparta, he allowed his Aegentine and Spartan troops to ravage Athenian territories. Athens retaliated by laying siege to Aegina. The Athenians under Pamphilius blockaded Aegina with their fleet as well as constructing fortifications investing the city by land. The naval blockade was lifted by the Spartan fleet under Teleutias but the Athenians continued to besiege Aegina by land. Soon thereafter, Teleutias was replaced by Hierax who installed Gorgopas as governor. Gorgopas was successful in lifting the siege and in several offensive operations, but was subsequently killed in an ambush. Eteonicus apparently did not leave Aegina after Gorgopas became governor and assumed command after his death. However, he was unable to compel his troops to undertake further offensive operations due to lack of pay. Teleutias was recalled to take overall command. Through his reputation with the troops and personal charisma he was able to restore discipline despite not having any additional funds.
