= Dionysius (Athenian commander) =

Athenian commander (4th c. BC)

Dionysius (Ancient Greek: Διονύσιος) was an Athenian commander during the Corinthian War. In 388 BC, he participated in naval operations around Abydus. Along with fellow commanders Demaenetus, Leontichus and Phanias, Dionysius unsuccessfully pursued the Spartan fleet under Antalcidas. However, Antalcidas was able to evade them and link up with an ally Syracusan and Italian squadron at Abydus.
