= Phanias concoloratus =

Scientific classification
- Kingdom: Animalia
- Phylum: Arthropoda
- Subphylum: Chelicerata
- Class: Arachnida
- Order: Araneae
- Infraorder: Araneomorphae
- Family: Salticidae
- Genus: Phanias
- Species: P. concoloratus

Binomial name
- Phanias concoloratus (Chamberlin & Gertsch, 1930)

Species of spider

Phanias concoloratus is a species of jumping spider in the family Salticidae. It is found in the United States.
