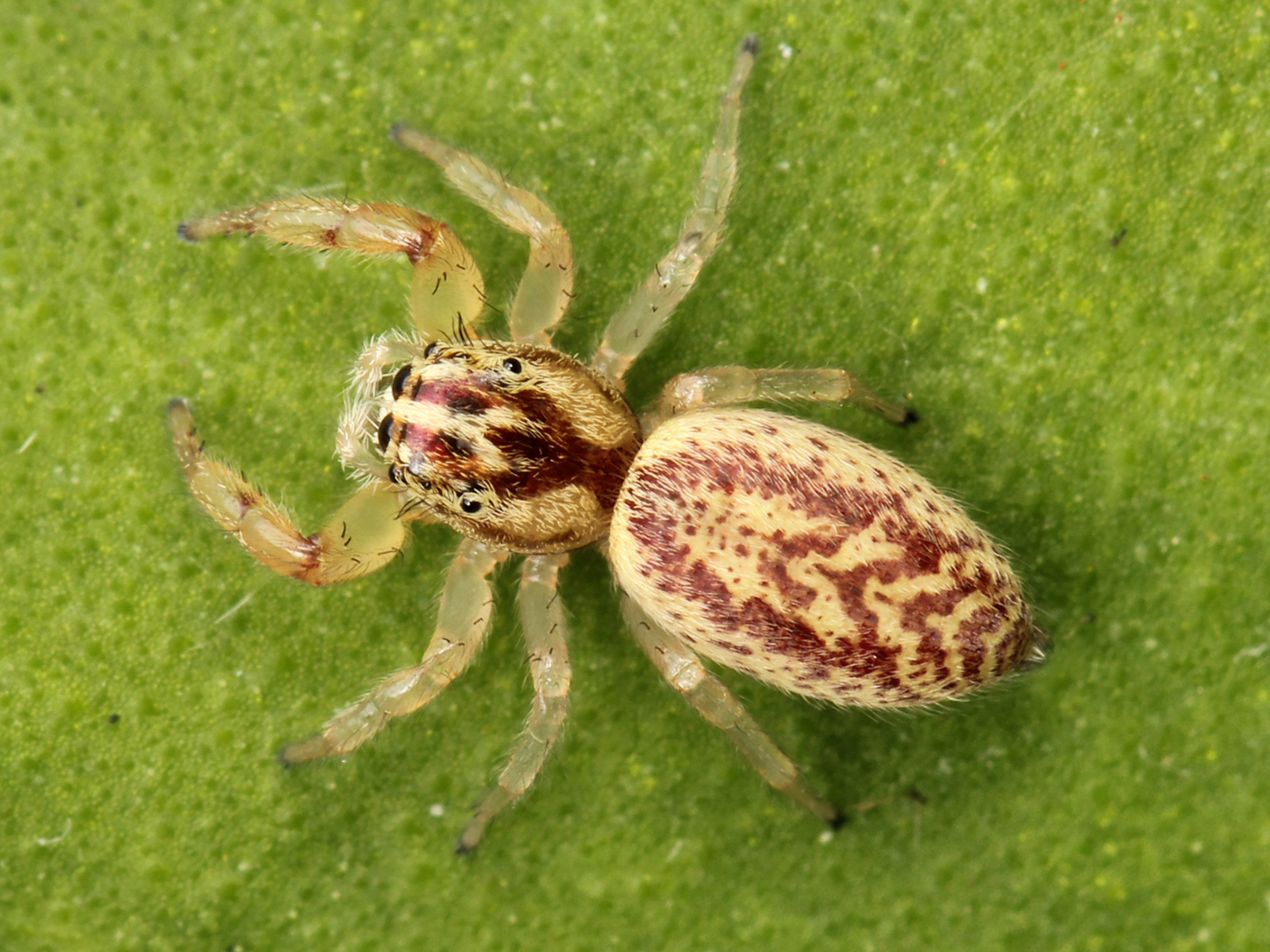

Scientific classification
- Kingdom: Animalia
- Phylum: Arthropoda
- Subphylum: Chelicerata
- Class: Arachnida
- Order: Araneae
- Infraorder: Araneomorphae
- Family: Salticidae
- Genus: Phanias
- Species: P. watonus

Binomial name
- Phanias watonus (Chamberlin & Ivie, 1941)

= Phanias watonus =

Species of spider

Phanias watonus is a species of jumping spider in the family Salticidae. It is found in the United States.

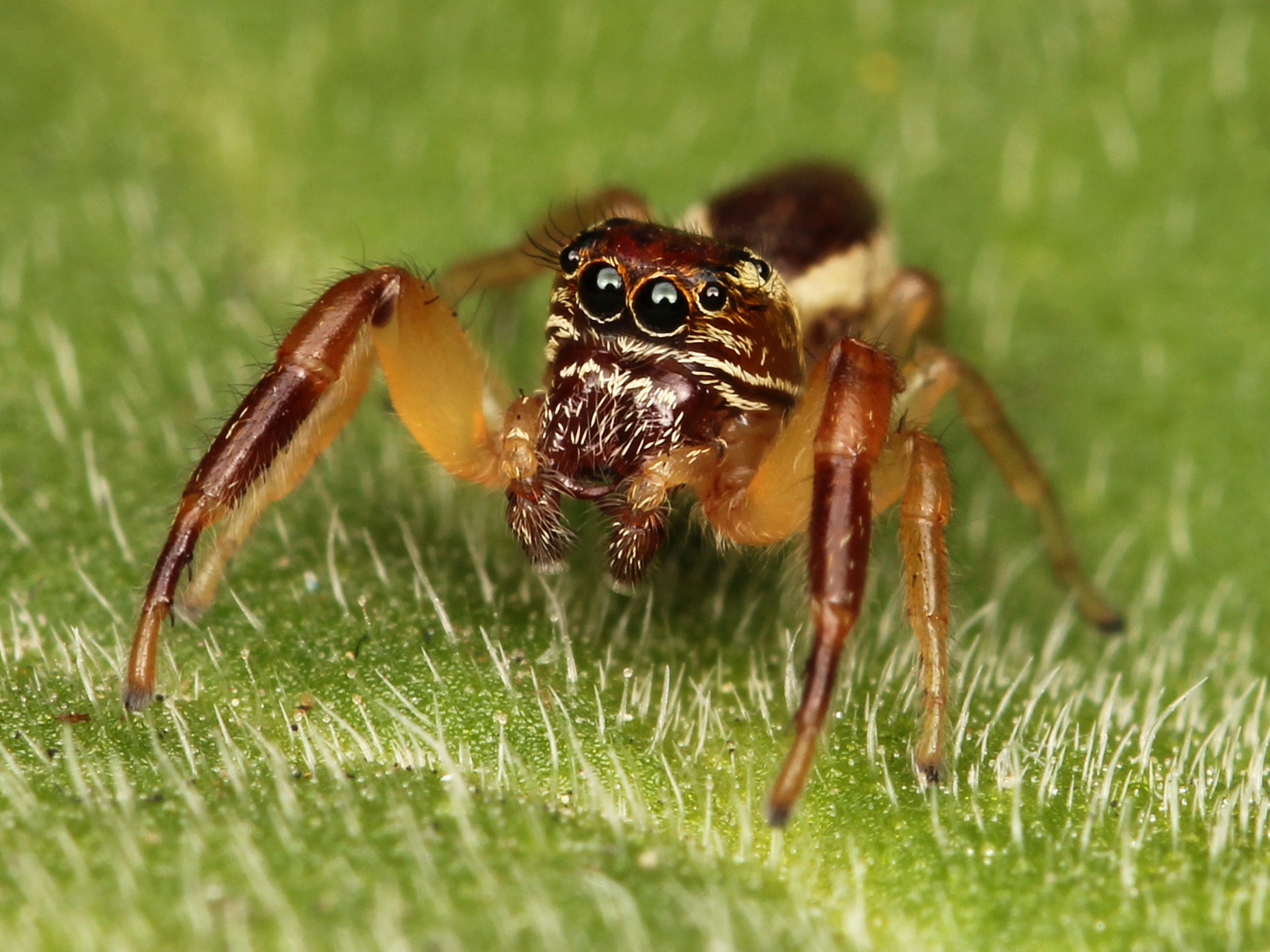

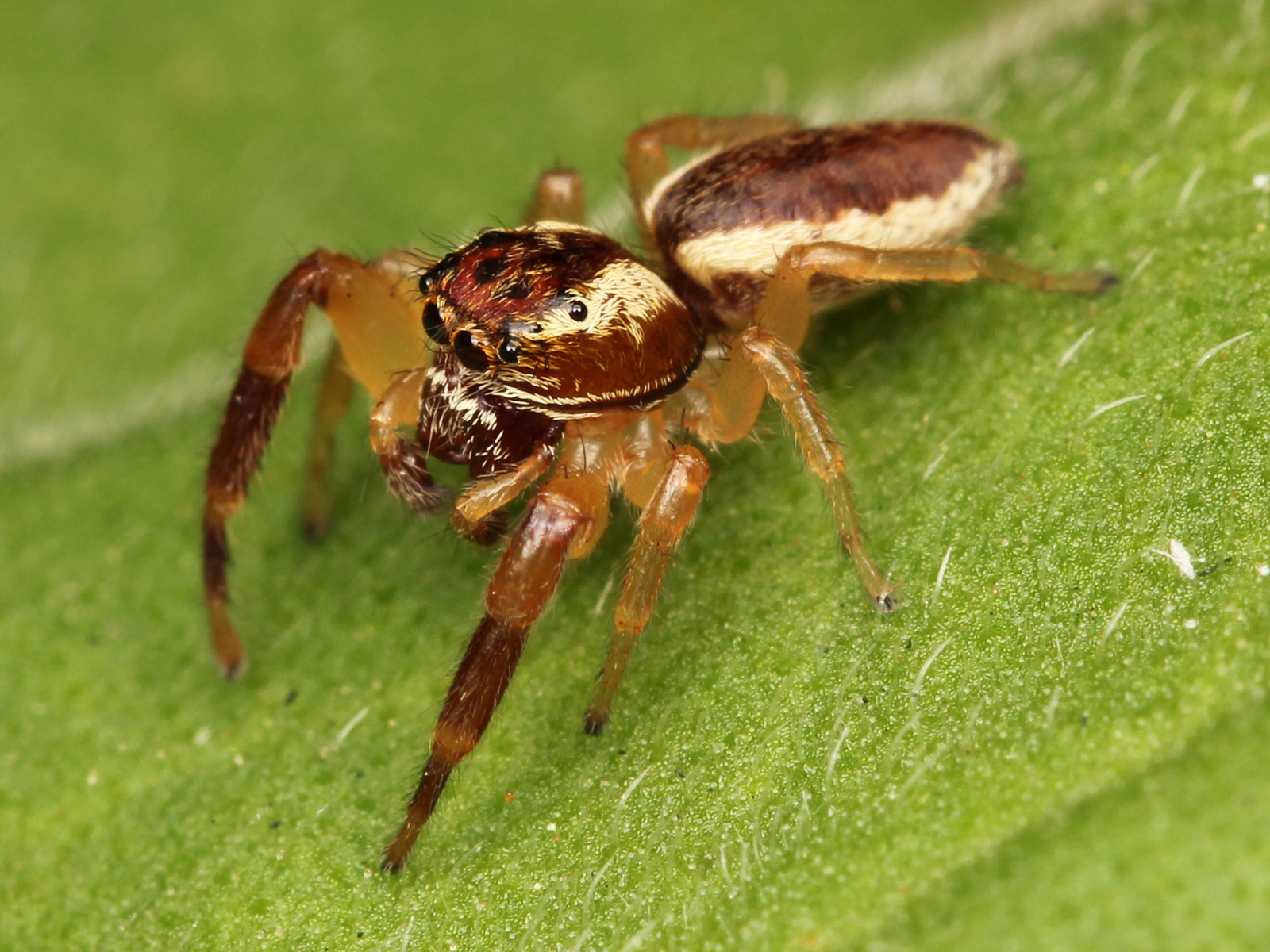
