= Eunomus (admiral) =

4th-century BC Athenian admiral

- Rank: Admiral
- Battles / wars: Corinthian War

Eunomus (Ancient Greek: Εὔνομος) was an Athenian admiral during the Corinthian War. In 389 BC he was put in charge of a fleet of 13 triremes to check the operation of the Spartan commander Gorgopas operating out of Aegina.

Eunomus encountered Gorgopas as he was sailing back to Aegina from Ephesus. Gorgopas retreated and was able to make it back to the port in Aegina. After unsuccessfully trying to bait Gorgopas to come out and fight, the Athenians sailed away at night fall. The lead Athenian ship carried a customary light which the other ships could follow. Gorgopas, keeping his ships dark, followed the light of the Athenian ship. He was able to surprise the Athenian fleet as it passed close to shore around Cape Zoster. The Spartans captured four triremes and forced the rest of the Athenian ships to retreat to Piraeus.
