= Gorgopas (4th century BC) =

Spartan commander during the Corinthian War

Gorgopas was a Spartan commander during the Corinthian War. In 388 BC Hierax was dispatched by Sparta to Aegina to take over the Spartan fleet. The Spartans under the command of Teleutias had earlier driven off the Athenian fleet blockading Aegina. Soon after taking over, Hierax departed for Rhodes with most of the fleet leaving Gorgopas, his vice-admiral with twelve triremes as governor in Aegina, replacing Eteonicus who held the post before. Gorgopas continued operations against the Athenian army led by Pamphilius who was still laying siege to the city. He ultimately forced Athens to send ships to evacuate their land forces from the area. Gorgopas then went on to harass the Athenian territory from his base in Aegina.

Not long afterwards, Gorgopas took his fleet to Ephesus to escort Antalcidas who was sent to replace Hierax as admiral. Upon completing his mission, on the way back to Aegina he encountered the Athenian fleet under Eunomus. Gorgopas retreated and was able to make it back to the port in Aegina. After unsuccessfully trying to bait Gorgopas to come out and fight, the Athenians sailed away at night fall. The lead Athenian ship carried a customary light which the other ships could follow. Gorgopas, keeping his ships dark, followed the light of the Athenian ship. He was able to surprise the Athenian fleet as it passed close to shore around Cape Zoster. The Spartans captured four triremes and forced the rest of the Athenian ships to retreat to Piraeus.

Gorgopas was killed in an ambush later that year. One Athenian unit under Chabrias lay in ambush while another under Demaenetus drew Gorgopas out of Aegina and into the trap by openly marching through the area.
