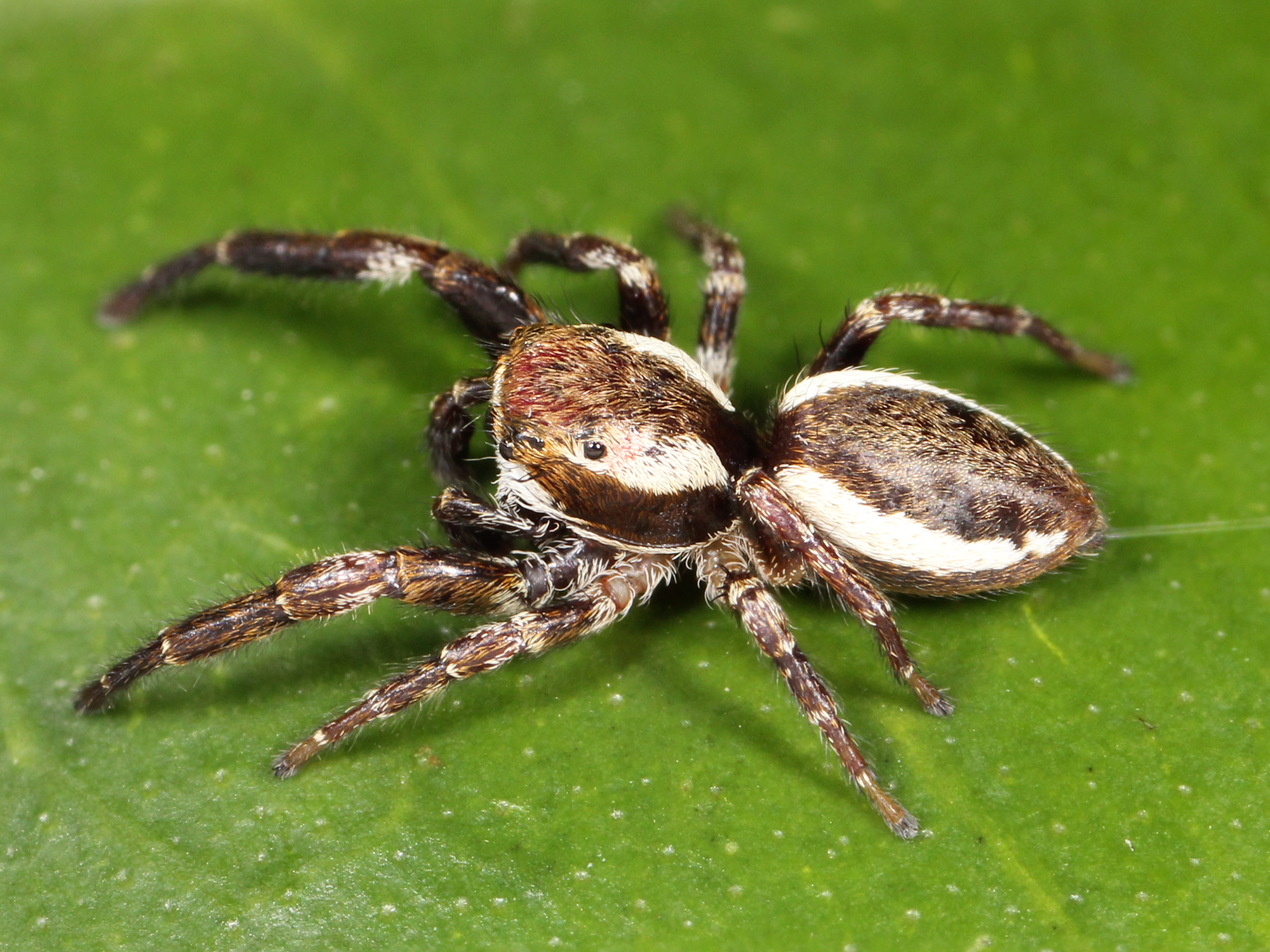

Scientific classification
- Kingdom: Animalia
- Phylum: Arthropoda
- Subphylum: Chelicerata
- Class: Arachnida
- Order: Araneae
- Infraorder: Araneomorphae
- Family: Salticidae
- Genus: Phanias
- Species: P. albeolus

Binomial name
- Phanias albeolus (Chamberlin & Ivie, 1941)

= Phanias albeolus =

Species of spider

Phanias albeolus is a species of jumping spider in the family Salticidae. It is found in the United States.

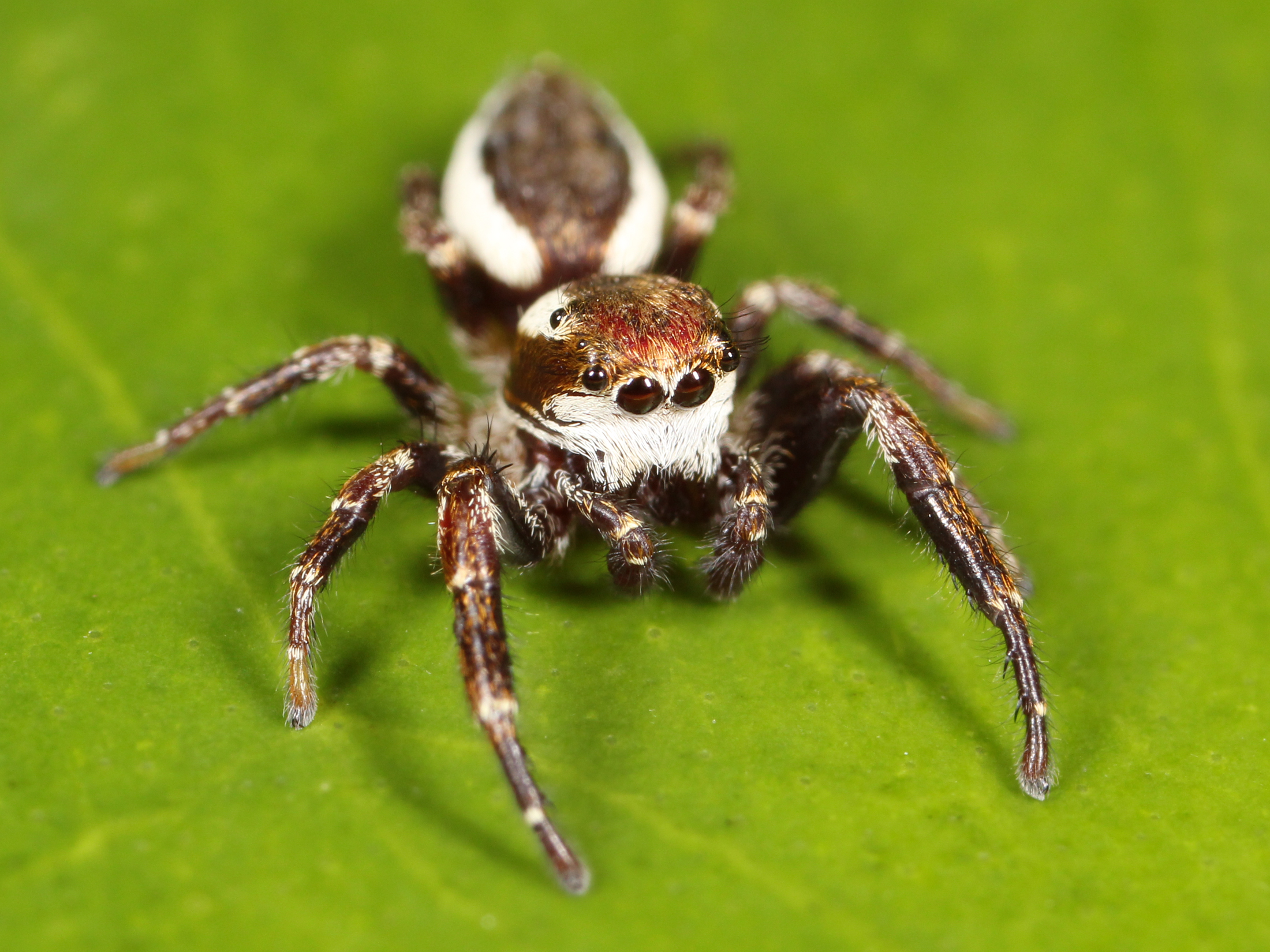

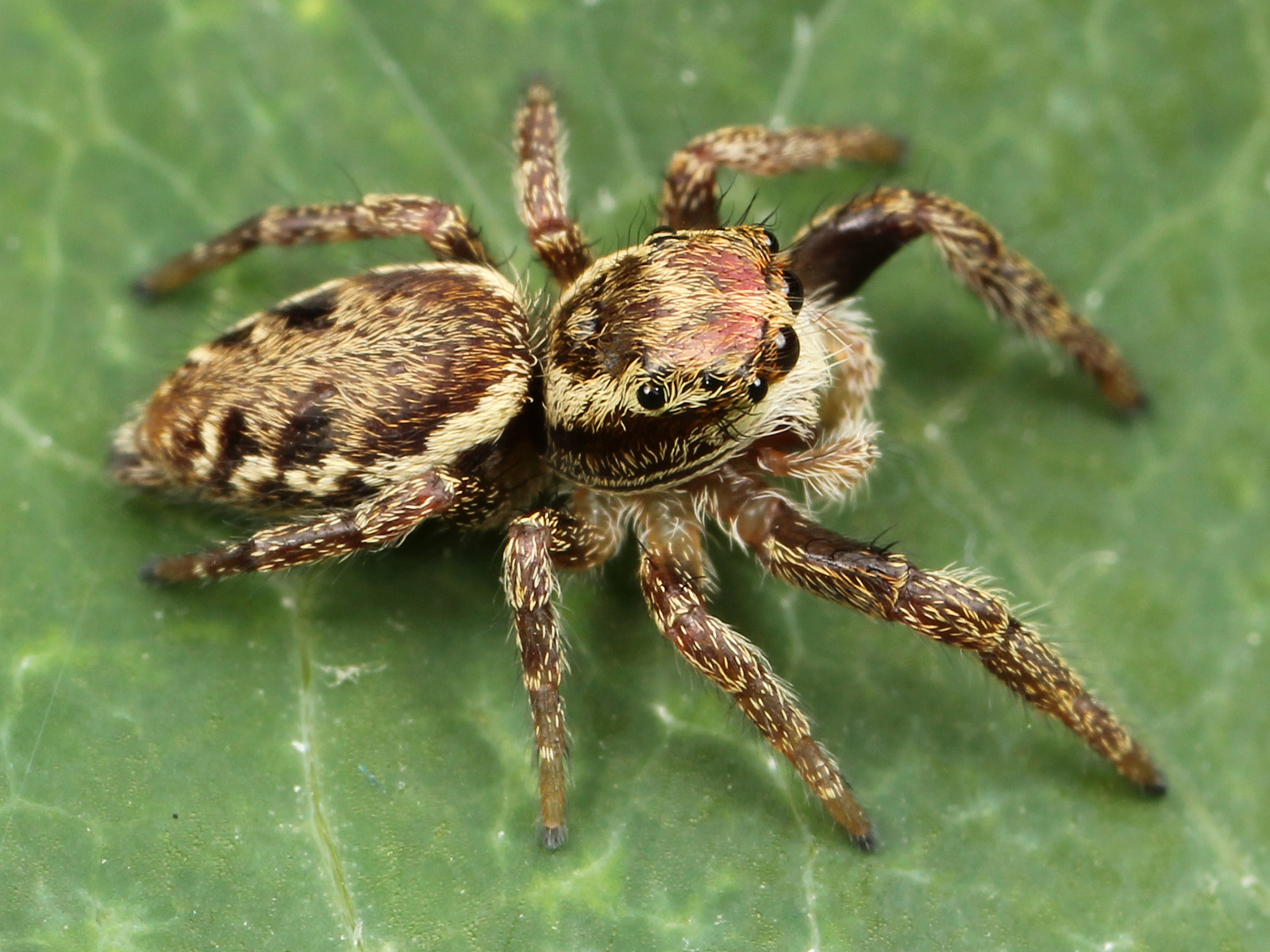
