= Demaenetus =

Athenian commander during the Corinthian War

Demaenetus (Greek: Δημαίνετος) was an Athenian commander during the Corinthian War. In 389 BC, he was one of the commanders in an engagement close to Aegina that resulted in a Spartan defeat and the death of the Spartan commander Gorgopas. One Athenian unit under Chabrias prepared an ambush while another under Demaenetus drew Gorgopas out of Aegina and into the trap by openly marching through the area.

Demaenetus also participated in naval operations around Abydos in the following year. He along with fellow commanders Dionysius, Leontichus and Phanias unsuccessfully pursued the Spartan fleet under Antalcidas. However, Antalcidas was able to evade them and link up with an allied Syracusan and Italian squadron at Abydos.
