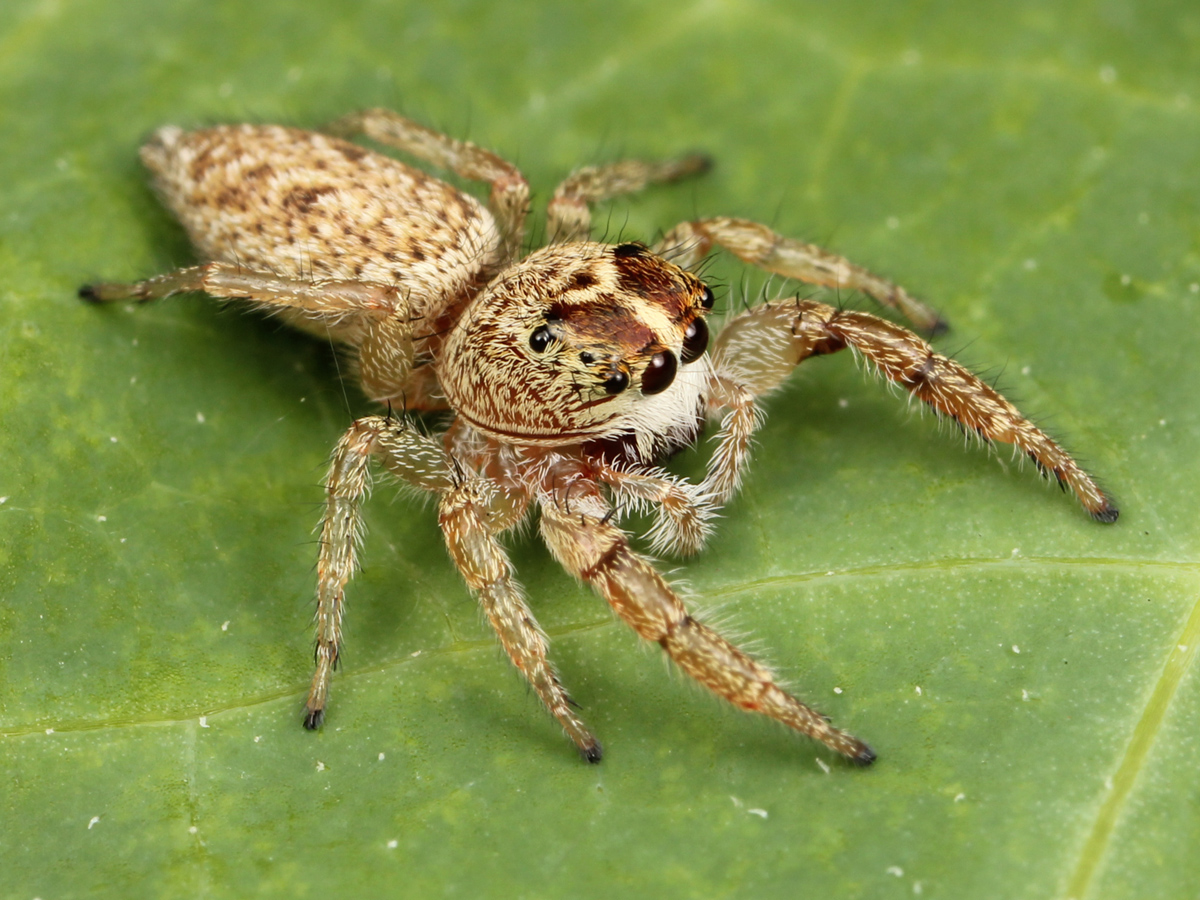
- Female in Oakland, California
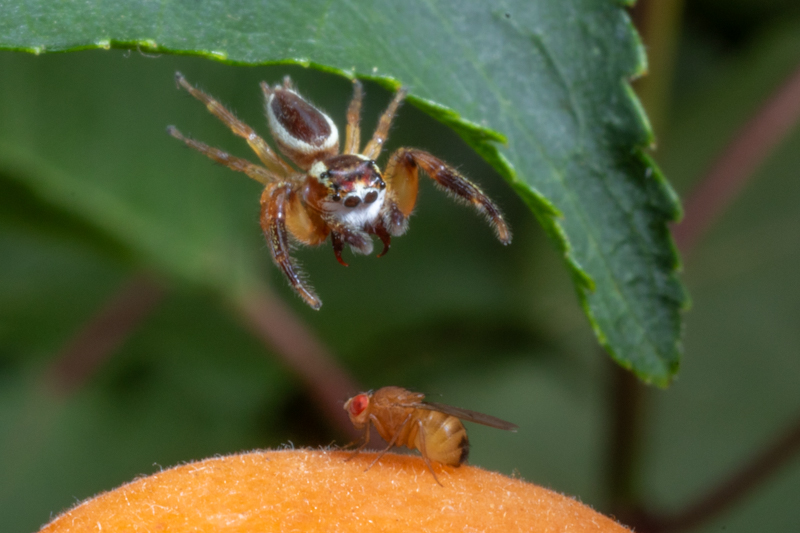
- Male in Berkeley, California

Scientific classification
- Kingdom: Animalia
- Phylum: Arthropoda
- Subphylum: Chelicerata
- Class: Arachnida
- Order: Araneae
- Infraorder: Araneomorphae
- Family: Salticidae
- Genus: Phanias
- Species: P. harfordi

Binomial name
- Phanias harfordi (Peckham & Peckham, 1888)

= Phanias harfordi =

Species of spider

Phanias harfordi is a species of jumping spider in the family Salticidae. It is found in the United States.
