= Leontichus =

Athenian commander during the Corinthian War

Leontichus (Greek: Λεόντιχος) was an Athenian commander during the Corinthian War. In 388 BC, he participated in naval operations around Abydus and along with fellow commanders Demaenetus, Dionysius and Phanias unsuccessfully pursued the Spartan fleet under Antalcidas. However, Antalcidas was able to evade them and link up with an allied Syracusan and Italian squadron at Abydus.
