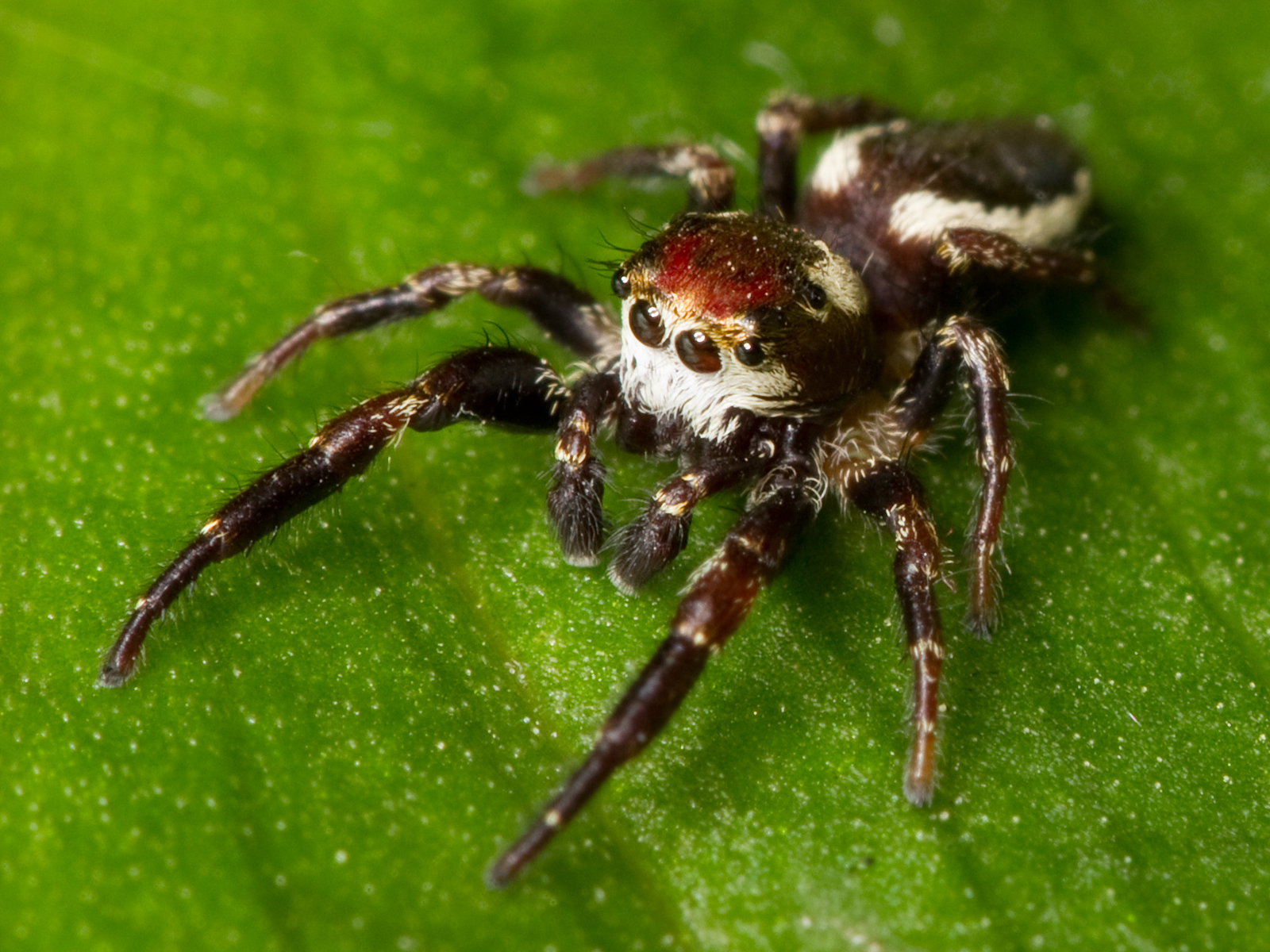
- Male Phanias albeolus

Scientific classification
- Kingdom: Animalia
- Phylum: Arthropoda
- Subphylum: Chelicerata
- Class: Arachnida
- Order: Araneae
- Infraorder: Araneomorphae
- Family: Salticidae
- Subfamily: Salticinae
- Genus: Phanias; F. O. Pickard-Cambridge, 1901

Type species
- P. flavostriatus F. O. Pickard-Cambridge, 1901

Species
- 11, see text

= Phanias (spider) =

Genus of spiders

Phanias is a genus of jumping spiders that was first described by Frederick Octavius Pickard-Cambridge in 1901. They are similar to members of Marpissa, but have three pairs of spines beneath the first tibia.

== Species ==
As of August 2019 it contains eleven species, found only in Mexico, the United States, and El Salvador:

- Phanias albeolus (Chamberlin & Ivie, 1941) – USA
- Phanias concoloratus (Chamberlin & Gertsch, 1930) – USA
- Phanias dominatus (Chamberlin & Ivie, 1941) – USA
- Phanias flavostriatus F. O. Pickard-Cambridge, 1901 (type) – Mexico
- Phanias furcifer (Gertsch, 1936) – USA
- Phanias furcillatus (F. O. Pickard-Cambridge, 1901) – Mexico
- Phanias harfordi (Peckham & Peckham, 1888) – USA
- Phanias monticola (Banks, 1895) – USA
- Phanias neomexicanus (Banks, 1901) – USA
- Phanias salvadorensis Kraus, 1955 – El Salvador
- Phanias watonus (Chamberlin & Ivie, 1941) – USA
