= Phanias (Athenian commander) =

4th century BC Athenian naval commander

Phanias (Greek: Φανίας) (fl. 4th century BC) was an Athenian commander during the Corinthian War. In 388 BC, he participated in naval operations around Abydus. He, along with fellow commanders Demaenetus, Leontichus and Dionysius unsuccessfully pursued the Spartan fleet under Antalcidas. However, Antalcidas was able to evade them and link up with an allied Syracusan and Italian squadron at Abydus.
