= Hierax (Spartan admiral) =

Spartan admiral during the Corinthian War

Hierax (Ancient Greek: Ἱέραξ) was a Spartan admiral during the Corinthian War. In 389 BC he was dispatched by Sparta to Aegina, to take over the Spartan fleet. The Spartans under the command of Teleutias had earlier driven off the Athenian fleet blockading Aegina. Soon after taking command, Hierax departed for Rhodes with most of the fleet, leaving Gorgopas, his vice-admiral, with twelve triremes as governor in Aegina.

Not long afterward, Antalcidas was sent to replace Hierax as admiral.
