= Zeuxippus =

Zeuxippus is a Greek name that may refer to:

- Ancient Greece-related (also Zeuxippos):
  - Zeuxippus (mythology), name of three minor figures in Greek mythology
  - Zeuxippus of Heraclea (5th century BCE), ancient Greek painter
  - Zeuxippus of Boeotia, leader of a pro-Roman political party in the early 2nd century BCE
  - Zeuxippus, a Pyrrhonist philosopher mentioned in Diogenes Laërtius
  - Zeuxippus of Sparta, a friend of Plutarch
  - Baths of Zeuxippus, famous Roman baths in Constantinople
- Biological nomenclature:
  - Zeuxippus (spider), a genus of the family Salticidae
