= Zeuxippus atellanus =

Scientific classification
- Kingdom: Animalia
- Phylum: Arthropoda
- Subphylum: Chelicerata
- Class: Arachnida
- Order: Araneae
- Infraorder: Araneomorphae
- Family: Salticidae
- Genus: Zeuxippus
- Species: Z. atellanus

Binomial name
- Zeuxippus atellanus Thorell, 1895

Species of spider

Zeuxippus atellanus is a spider species of the jumping spider family, Salticidae. It is found in Burma.
