= Zeuxippus histrio =

Scientific classification
- Kingdom: Animalia
- Phylum: Arthropoda
- Subphylum: Chelicerata
- Class: Arachnida
- Order: Araneae
- Infraorder: Araneomorphae
- Family: Salticidae
- Genus: Zeuxippus
- Species: Z. histrio

Binomial name
- Zeuxippus histrio Thorell, 1891

Species of spider

Zeuxippus histrio is a species of spider in the jumping spider family, Salticidae. It is found in India.
