= Zeuxippus pallidus =

Scientific classification
- Kingdom: Animalia
- Phylum: Arthropoda
- Subphylum: Chelicerata
- Class: Arachnida
- Order: Araneae
- Infraorder: Araneomorphae
- Family: Salticidae
- Genus: Zeuxippus
- Species: Z. pallidus

Binomial name
- Zeuxippus pallidus Thorell, 1895

Synonyms
- Rhene argentata

Species of spider

Zeuxippus pallidus is a spider species of the jumping spider family, Salticidae. It is found in Bangladesh, Myanmar, China and Vietnam.

== Description ==
The male of Z. pallidus has an orange-brown hairy carapace. On the sides there are greyish-white, long hairs. The abdomen is greyish orange-brown with orange markings and light transverse streaks towards the rear. The legs are yellow-orange, except for the first pair, which is very hairy with long greyish-white and orange-brown hairs. The lighter female has greyish streaks on the sides of the abdomen.
