= Zeuxippus of Heraclea =

Ancient Greek teacher of painting

Zeuxippus of Heraclea (Greek: Ζεύξιππος; fl. 5th century BC) was an ancient Greek teacher of painting in Athens mentioned by Plato.
