= Zeuxippus (spider) =

Scientific classification
- Kingdom: Animalia
- Phylum: Arthropoda
- Subphylum: Chelicerata
- Class: Arachnida
- Order: Araneae
- Infraorder: Araneomorphae
- Family: Salticidae
- Subfamily: Salticinae
- Genus: Zeuxippus; Thorell, 1891

Type species
- Z. histrio Thorell, 1891

Species
- 4, see text

Genus of spiders

Zeuxippus was a genus of Asian jumping spiders that was first described by Tamerlan Thorell in 1891. The genus was synonymized with Rhene in 2022.

== Species ==
As of September 2019 it contained four species, found in Asia:

- Zeuxippus atellanus Thorell, 1895 – Myanmar
- Zeuxippus histrio Thorell, 1891 (type) – India
- Zeuxippus pallidus Thorell, 1895 – Bangladesh, Myanmar, China, Vietnam
- Zeuxippus yunnanensis Peng & Xie, 1995 – China
