= Othorus =

Othorus or Othoros (Ancient Greek: Ὄθορος) was a town of the Chalcidice in ancient Macedonia. It belonged to the Delian League since it appears in the tribute records of Athens between 448/7 and 434/3 BCE, as well as in a tributary decree of 422/1 BCE. It is probable that it was one of the cities of the Chalcidice that rebelled against Athens in the year 432 BCE.

Its site is unlocated.
