= Kleino (musician) =

Ancient Greek musician and courtier

Kleino (3rd-century BC) was an Ancient Greek musician and courtier.

She was a professional flute player, active in the Greek city of Alexandria in Egypt. She was appointed to the prestigious office of vine bearer to the king, Ptolemy II of Egypt. She became a well known public figure. Polybius reported that several public statues of her were seen all over Alexandria depicting her holding a vine cup.
