= Arbius =

Epithet of Zeus

Arbius (Ancient Greek: Ἄρβιος) was a toponymic epithet of the Greek god Zeus, derived from Mount Arbias in Crete – in modern times, the hills and chasms near Arvi – where he was worshipped.

It is also hypothesized that "Arbius" has some relationship to the Latin arbor ("tree"), as Zeus was known to have been worshipped as a tree god on Crete.
