= Koliorga =

Town of ancient Caria

Coordinates: 37°20′59″N 28°12′10″E

Koliorga (Ancient Greek: Κολιοργα) or Kolierga (Κολιεργα) was a town of ancient Caria. It was a polis (city-state) and a member of the Delian League.

Its site is located near Elekçi, Asiatic Turkey.
