= Penthus =

Personification of grief in Greek mythology

In Greek mythology, Penthus (Πενθος)/ˈpɛnθəs/ or Penthos was the personification of grief. He favors those who weep for the dead. It is believed that he likes to also torment the individuals who mourn. He accompanied Tisiphone when Hera sent her to madden Ino and Athamas.
