= Olaeis =

Town of ancient Caria

Coordinates: 37°05′00″N 28°20′00″E

Olaeis was a town of ancient Caria. The name is not attested but is inferred from epigraphic and other evidence. It was a polis (city-state) and a member of the Delian League.
