= Pyrrhichos =

God in Greek mythology

Pyrrhichos (Greek: Πυρῥιχος) in Greek mythology is the god of the rustic dance. The word Pyrrhichos translates as 'rustic war dance'.

== See also ==
- List of Greek deities
