= Hydria (Paros) =

Coordinates: 37°03′05″N 25°15′14″E

Hydria (Ancient Greek: Ὑδρία) was a town of ancient Greece on the island of Paros.

Its site is located on Paros.
