= Lysippides Painter =

Ancient Greek vase painter

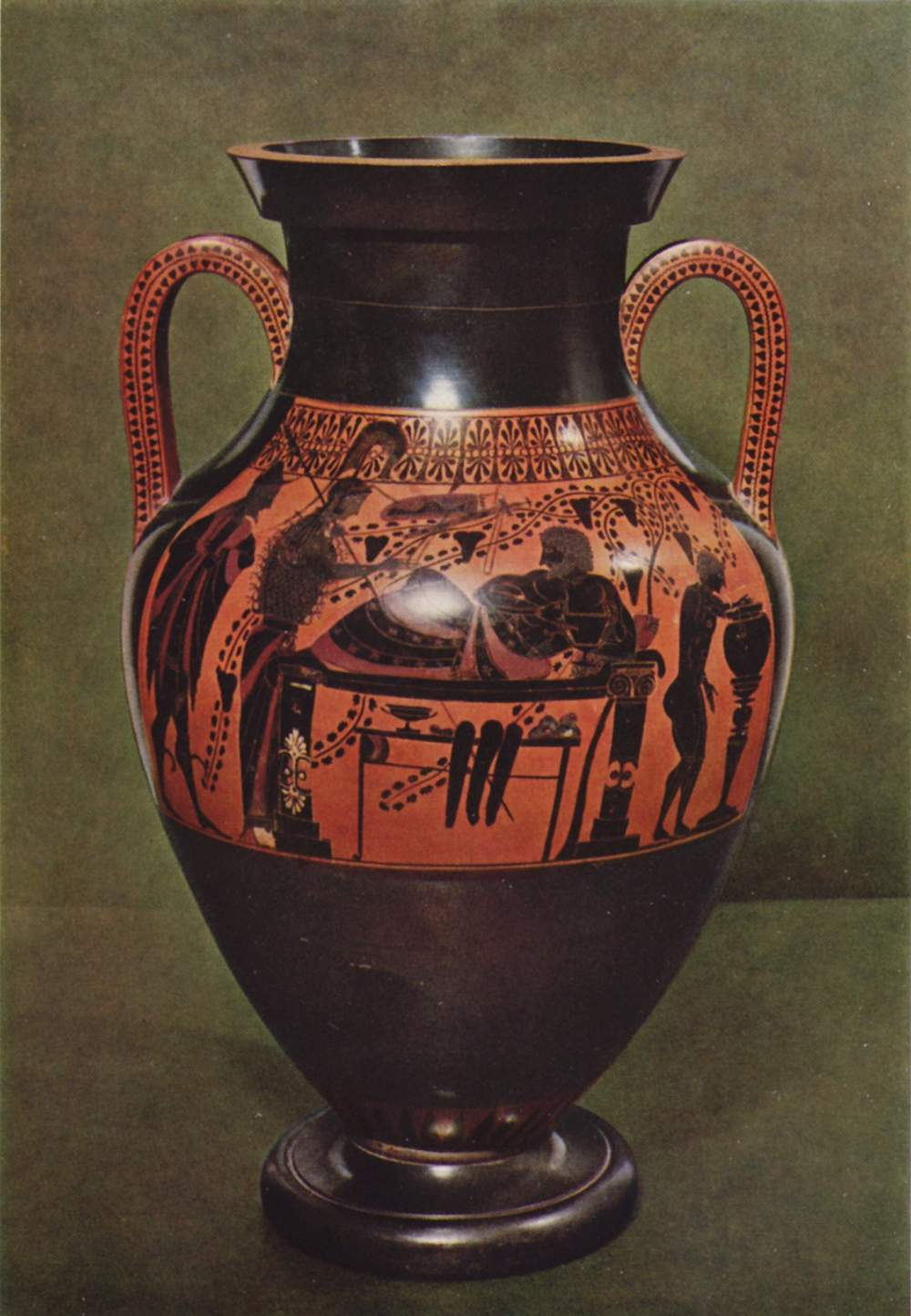
Bilingual belly amphora. Munich, Staatliche Antikensammlungen 2301; black-figure side: Herakles at the symposion.

The Lysippides Painter was an Attic vase painter in the black-figure style. He was active around 530 to 510 BC. His conventional name comes from a kalos inscription on a vase in the British Museum attributed to him; his real name is not known.

== Life and work ==
His conventional name is derived from a kalos inscription on a neck amphora in the British Museum (B 211). He is considered the most significant pupil of Exekias, from whom he adopted not only his artistic style but also some important motifs, such as Ajax and Achilleus playing a board game. He also frequently painted scenes involving the hero Herakles. In total, about 30 known vases are ascribed to him.

His collaboration with the Andokides Painter, usually considered the inventor of red-figure vase painting, is unusual. On seven bilingual vases, six belly amphorae and a cup (now in Palermo), he painted the red-figure side, while the Andokides Painter was responsible for the black-figure one. At times, the subjects painted by both are identical. It remains disputed amongst scholars whether both painters are identical and merely represent one artist using both techniques. Already John Beazley saw them as separate artists, an argument later developed by Beth Cohen and Heide Mommsen. The identity of the two painters is supported by Konrad Schauenburg, Herbert Marwitz and John Boardman. Martin Robinson and others remained undecided.

== Style ==
The Lysippides Painter's works consisted of many neck-amphorae that were based on the works of Exekias, his mentor. Lysippides' works however, were simplified compared to those of Exekias. This style actually became very popular in the Archaic Period. Especially showing in the late 6th century and early 5th as his neck-amphorae stand on the front lines of a series of vases. Many of his works were extremely similar to Exekias. A vase in Detroit depicts the mythical Greek hero, Herakles wrestling a lion. This depiction takes after a neck-amphorae version done by Exekias in multiple ways. While there is no saying that Lysippides is the painter, the vase is grouped with his work stylistically in the way it takes after Exekias and that the work narrows all the attention on Herakles' role in the battle rather than the lion's. These elements are strongly associated with the work of the Lysippides Painter. Like most artists during this time, his work contained many religious references of Greek gods and goddesses in his work. Herakles being one of the more popular.

Of the 204 vases attributed to the Lysippides Painter in the Beazley Archive, there are over 60 of Herakles in various forms of heroism, fighting the lion, mounting chariots with Athena, fighting Amazons (Amazonomachy), and fighting giants (Giantomachy). He is almost always shown in his lion cape, with hood resting on the back of his black hair, defined with white paint. The arms of the lion are tied around his chest (where muscles are also well defined with white lines).

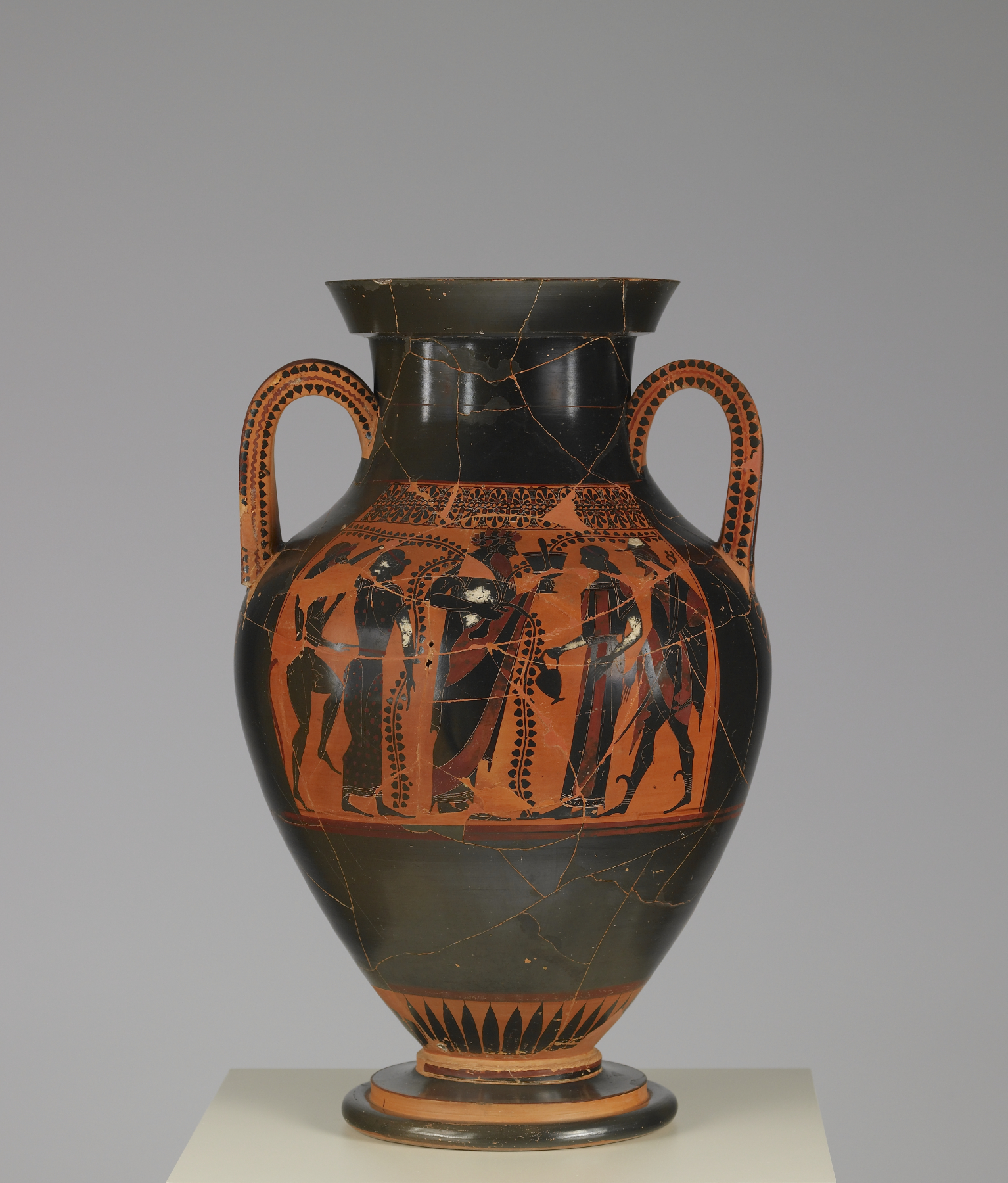
Work done exclusively by the Lysippides Painter

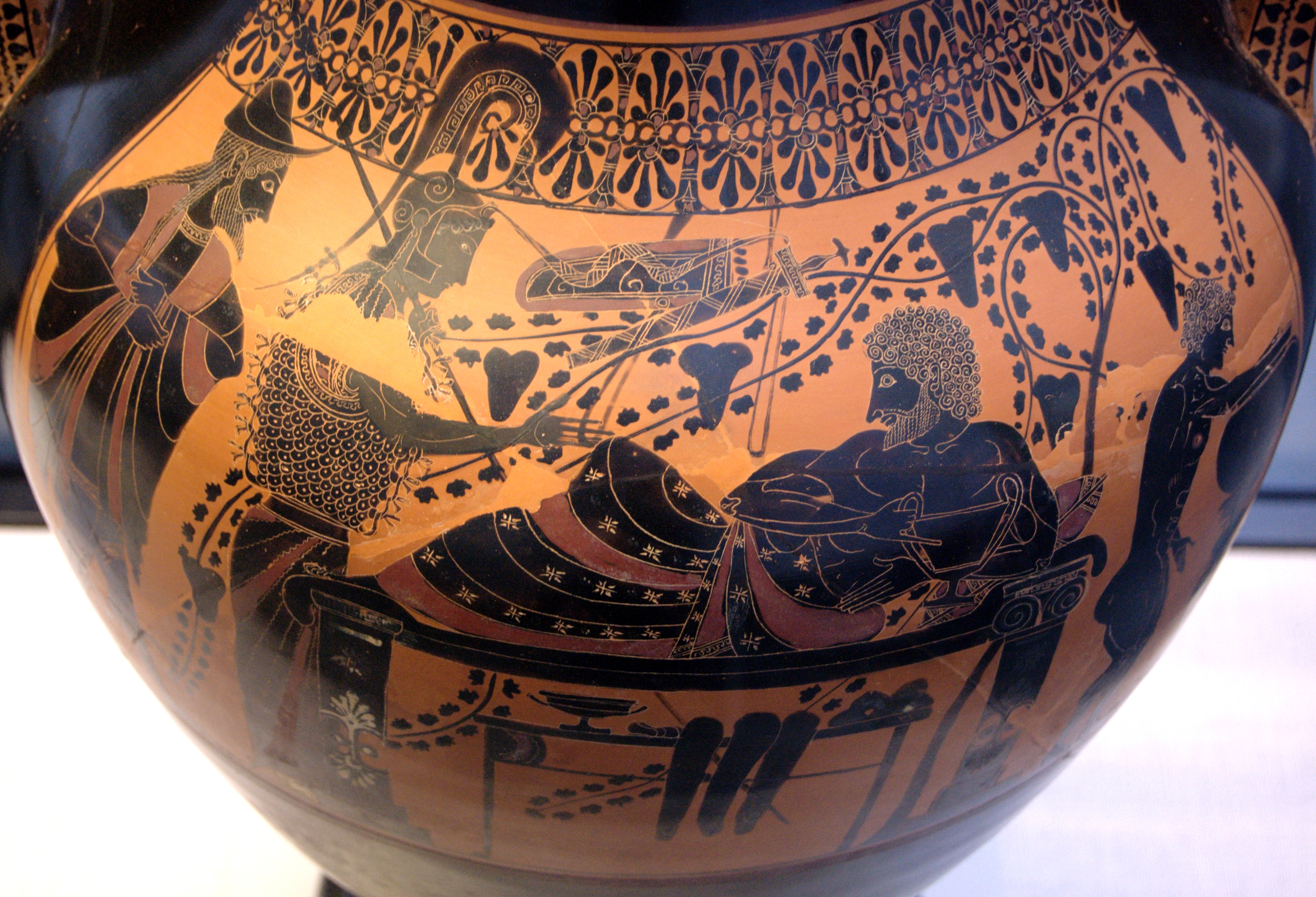
Work by the Lysippides Painter and the Andokides Painter done in black-figure style.

Of the 204 vases attributed to Lysippides P in the Beazley archives, 112 are large amphorae. These contain all variations of Amphorae, Amphora A, Amphora B, Amphora Neck, and 4 Panathenaic Amphorae. There are also 32 cups consisting of Cup A and Little Master Band Variations. The basins of many of these large cups are decorated with the face of a gorgonian. These Gorgonians are typical of the Nikostenes workshop to which, it has been argued, Lysippides was occasionally lent. Some of the other shapes that Lysippides works with are Krater, Columns, Oinchoes, Psykters, and Pyxis. These shapes have very small numbers, but many of them carry the same subjects as those of other Lysippides vases.

== Works ==
Most of the Lysippides Painter's vases appear to have been traded to Italy, especially the area around Rome, Etruria. Of the 85 vases that have listed provenances, 74 were shipped to Italy and over of 50 of these to the Etruria region. The other provenances include Sicily, Egypt and Turkey, but they appear in nominal numbers.

=== bilingual belly amphorae, painted in collaboration with the Andokides Painter ===
- Bologna, Museo Civico Archeologico

bilingual belly amphora 151

Front: Dionysos between maenad and satyrs, back: Herakles and the Nemean Lion

- Boston, Museum of Fine Arts

bilingual belly amphora 99.538

Front and back: Herakles and the Cretan bull

bilingual belly amphora 01.8037

Front and back: Achilles and Ajax playing a board game

- London, British Museum

bilingual belly amphora B 193

Front: Herakles and the Neman Lion between Athena and Iolaos, back: Ajax and Achilles playing a board game

- Munich, Staatliche Antikensammlungen

bilingual belly amphora 2301

Front and back: Herakles at the symposion

- Paris, Louvre

bilingual belly amphora F 204

Front: Herakles and Kerberos, back: Dionysos with kantharos between maenad and satyrs

=== other works (selection) ===
- Bonn, Akademisches Kunstmuseum

belly amphora 62b

- Cambridge, Fitzwilliam Museum

eye-cup GR 12.1937

Front: Dionysos with Kantharos between two satyrs, back: Herakles and Kyknos, interior: gorgoneion

- London, British Museum

neck amphora B 211
eye-cup B 426
oinochoe B 492

- Malibu, J. Paul Getty Museum

psykter 96.AE.94

- Moscow, Pushkin Museum

belly amphora II 1 B 70

- Munich, Staatliche Antikensammlungen

neck amphora 1478
neck amphora 1575
eye-cup 2080

Front: Herakles and Apollo fighting over a tripod, back: Herakles and the Nemean lion, Interior: gorgoneion

- Oxford, Ashmolean Museum

neck amphora 208
belly mphora 1965.100 (formerly Northwick, Spencer-Churchill collection)

- Palermo, Museo Archeologico Regionale

bilingual eye-cup V 650 (2051)

warriors and archers (signed by the potter Andokides)

- Paris, Louvre

hydria F 294

Athena mounting a chariot in the presence of Herakles, Dionysos, Apollon and Hermes (potter probably Andokides)

- Château de Pregny, Rothschild Collection

belly amphora

- Rome, Museo Nazionale Etrusco di Villa Giulia

belly amphora 24998

- Zurich, University

neck amphora ETH 7

== Bibliography ==
- John Beazley: Attic Black-figure Vase-painters. Oxford 1956, p. 253–257 (p. 257–265: Style of the Lysippides Painter).
- Herbert Marwitz: Zur Einheit des Andokidesmalers, in: Jahreshefte des Österreichischen Archäologischen Institutes 46, 1961–63, p. 73–104.
- Elfriede R. Knauer: Die Berliner Andokides-Vase, Werkmonographien zur Bildenden Kunst in Reclams Universal-Bibliothek 103, Stuttgart 1965
- John Beazley: Paralipomena. Additions to Attic black-figure vase-painters and to Attic red-figure vase-painters, Oxford 1971, p. 113–116.
- John Boardman: Schwarzfigurige Vasen aus Athen. Ein Handbuch, von Zabern, Mainz 1977 (Kulturgeschichte der Antiken Welt, Vol 1) ISBN 3-8053-0233-9, p.
- Beth Cohen: Attic Bilingual Vases and their Painters, New York 1978 ISBN 0-8240-3220-9
- Martin Robertson: The art of vase-painting in classical Athens, Cambridge 1992, p. 9-14.
- Heide Mommsen: Lysippides-Maler, in: Der Neue Pauly Vol. 7, 1999, Col. 610.
- Marianne Pécasse: Recherches sur l'atelier d'Andokidès: transmission de modèles et circulation d'artisans, Dissertation Université Panthéon-Sorbonne Paris 2001
- Beth Cohen: Bilingual Vases and Vase-Painters, in: ibid.: The Colours of Clay. Special Techniques in Athenian Vases, Los Angeles 2006, p. 18–25.
- John Beazley, The Development of Attic Black-figure, Volume 24. California: University of California Press, 1951
- Madigan and Brian Christopher, Corinthian and Attic Vases in the Detroit Institute of Arts: Geometric, Black-figure, and Red-figure. Monumenta Graeca Et Romana: Print/Save 100 pages, 2008
