= Bilingual vase painting =

Ancient Greek method for painting pottery

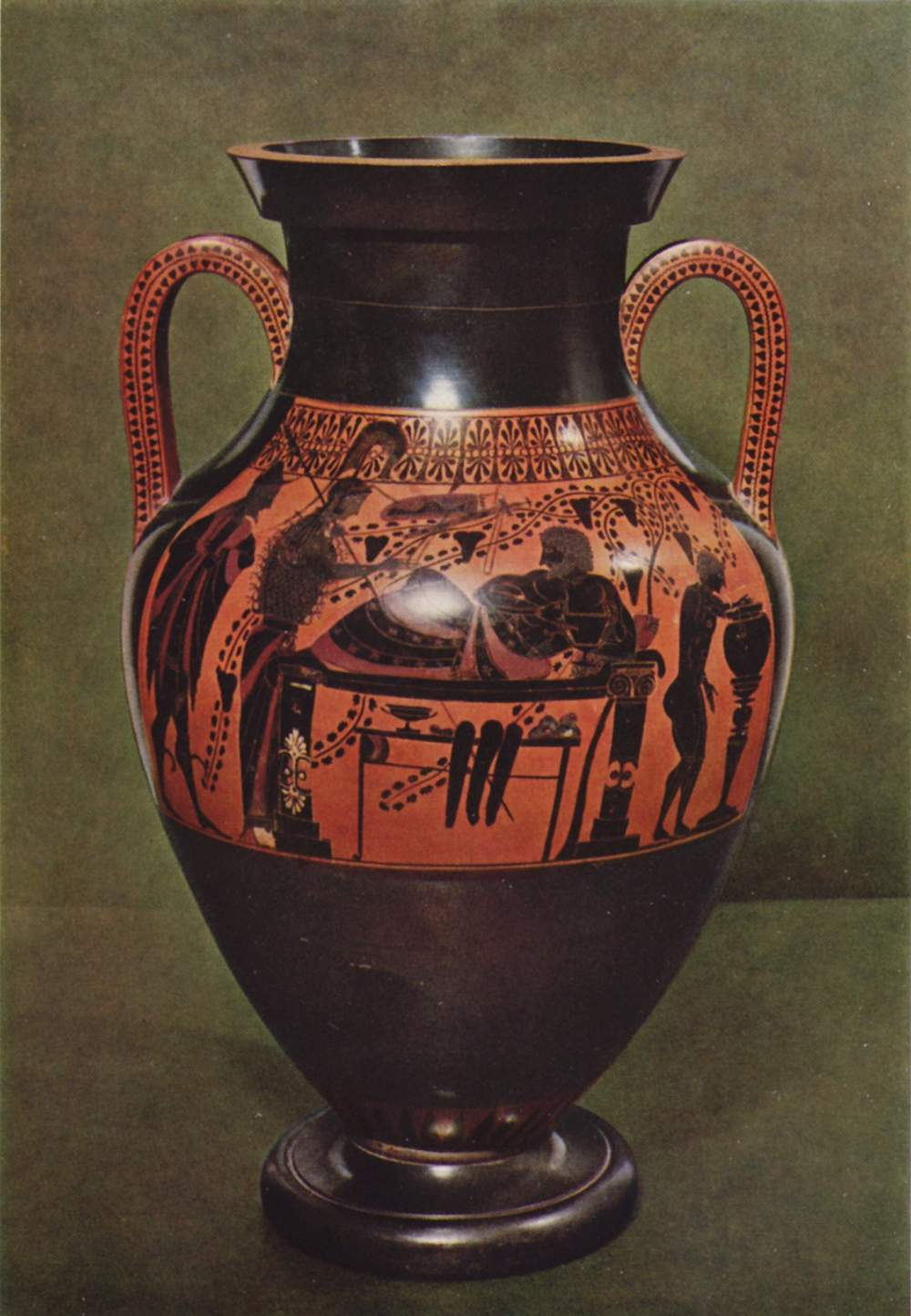
Heracles resting on a couch, black-figure side of a belly amphora by the Andokides Painter, circa 520/510 BC. Munich: Staatliche Antikensammlungen.

Bilingual vase painting is a special form of ancient Greek vase painting. The term, derived from linguistics, is essentially a metaphorical one; it describes vases that are painted both in the black-figure and in the red-figure techniques. It also describes the transitional period when black-figure was being gradually replaced in dominance by red-figure, basically the last quarter of the 6th and the very beginning of the 5th century BC. Their appearance may be due to the initial uncertainty of the market for the new red-figure style, although that style subsequently became dominant rather fast.

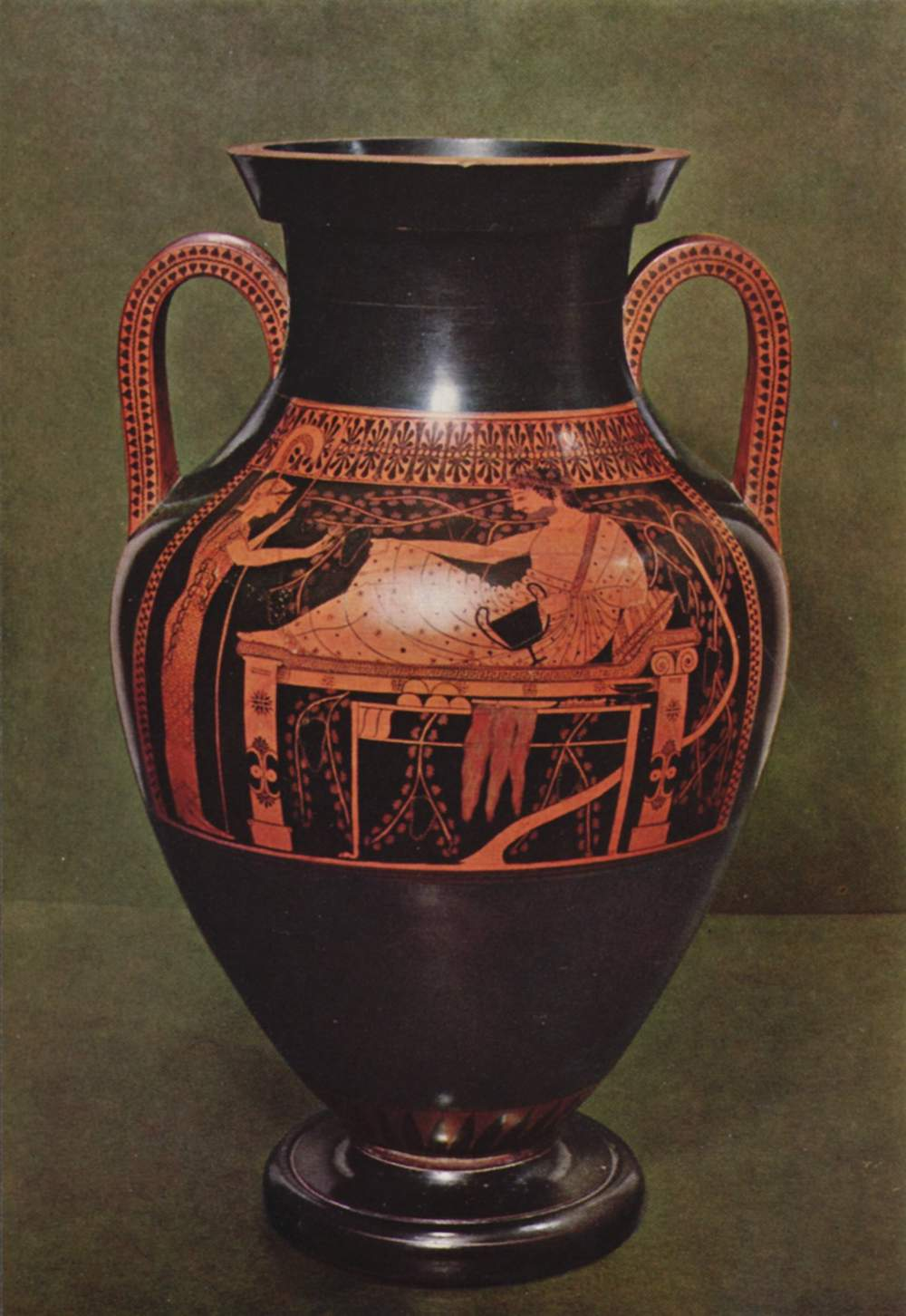
Red-figure side of the vase illustrated above, same subject

== History ==
Bilingual vase painting was almost entirely restricted to belly amphorae of type B and to eye-cups. In some cases, either side of an amphora bore a depiction of the same motif, one in black-figure, the other in red-figure (e.g. on the belly amphora by the Andokides Painter, Munich 2301). Eye-cups usually feature a black-figure image on the interior, and red-figure motifs on the external surface. An exception to this is a kylix by the Andokides Painter in Palermo, on which the exterior is painted half in black-figure and half in red-figure. Apart from the Andokides Painter, bilingual works were produced primarily by Psiax (especially belly amphorae), as well as by Epiktetos and Oltos (eye-cups). Usually, both paintings (in both styles) on one vase are produced by the same artist. In some cases, however, this is controversial. This applies especially to the Andokides Painter, whose black-figure work is ascribed by some scholars to the Lysippides Painter, who, in turn, is sometimes seen as identical with the Andokides Painter.

== Bibliography ==
- Irma Wehgartner: Bilingue Vasen, in Der Neue Pauly Vol. 2 (1997), Col. 677

== Other examples ==
- Andocides painter 530 BC. Black figure side of "Bilingual" vase: Athena and Herakles.
- Lysippides painter 530 BC. Black figure side of "Bilingual" vase: Herakles & sacrificial bull.
