= Crouching Satyr Eye-Cup =

The Crouching Satyr Eye-Cup is a ceramic vessel located in gallery 215B in the Museum of Fine Arts in Boston, Massachusetts, is an ancient Greek kylix dating to the Archaic Period (525–500 BCE). The cup, which was used within Ancient Greek symposiums as a form of entertainment amongst drunken revelers, was bought in London from an old collection, and eventually purchased by the MFA from Edward Perry Warren in March 1903.

== Technique ==
The kylix is decorated using black-figure technique, a common method of the Archaic Period, but is unique in style amongst other vessels of its time. The most distinguishable feature of the eye-cup is the two sets of eyes on either side of the body, which create the illusion of a mask when the user drinks from the vessel. When the cup is in use, the handles acts as the ears and the base of the foot represents the mouth of the user.

== Motifs and iconography ==
The vessel also features a crouching satyr, which represents a follower of Dionysus, the Greek God of theatre, masks, and wine. The satyr is pictured clutching a vine that fills the negative space throughout the exterior of the vessel, and the face of the satyr contains iconography similar to that of a gorgon, a common motif amongst Archaic Period artwork. Other iconography includes Pegasus being chased by a lion along the frieze of the base, as well as two identical sirens—half-bird, half-women seductresses from the Odyssey— beneath each handle.

The sirens, particularly when paired with the gorgon-faced satyr, are not atypical for an Archaic Period vessel; most pieces from the period reference commonly known mythology to some varying degree. The interior of the cup is painted black, with concentric orange and black circles on the tondo.

== Provenance ==
The majority of these vessels were found as grave goods amongst Etruscan and Greek chamber tombs, though the exact provenance and artist of this piece are unknown. Greek vase-painter and potter Exekias is thought to have been the creator of this distinctive Attic style of vase painting, though there is no inscription on the Crouching Satyr eye-cup that distinguishes him as the artist.
