= Psiax =

Late 6th-century BC Attic vase painter

Psiax (formerly the Menon Painter)
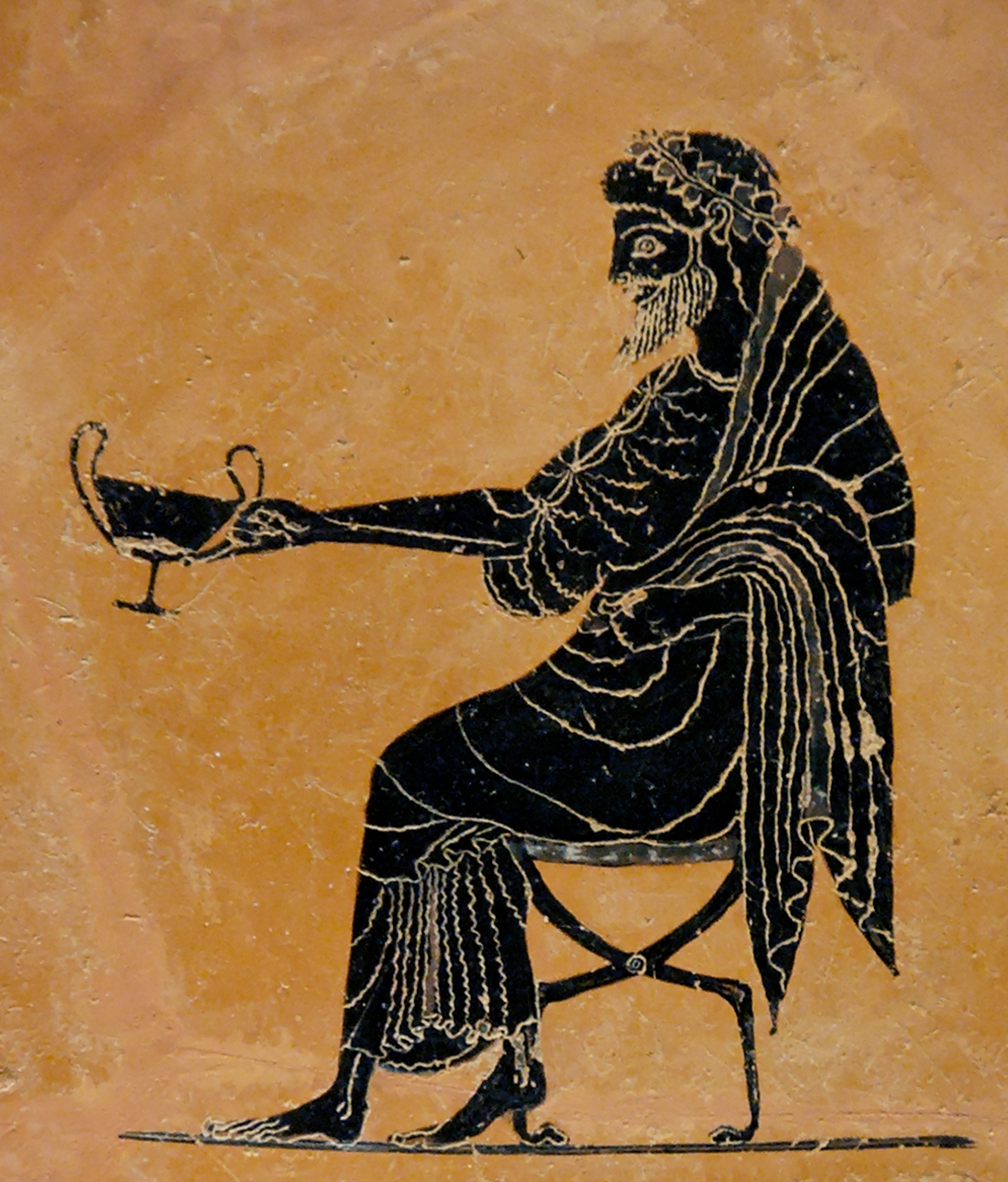
- Dionysos holding out a kantharos, black-figured plate by Psiax, ca. 520-500 BC, British Museum (B 589).
- Born: Psiax; Before 525 BC; Attica
- Died: About 505 BC
- Known for: Vase painting
- Movement: Black-figure and Red-figure styles

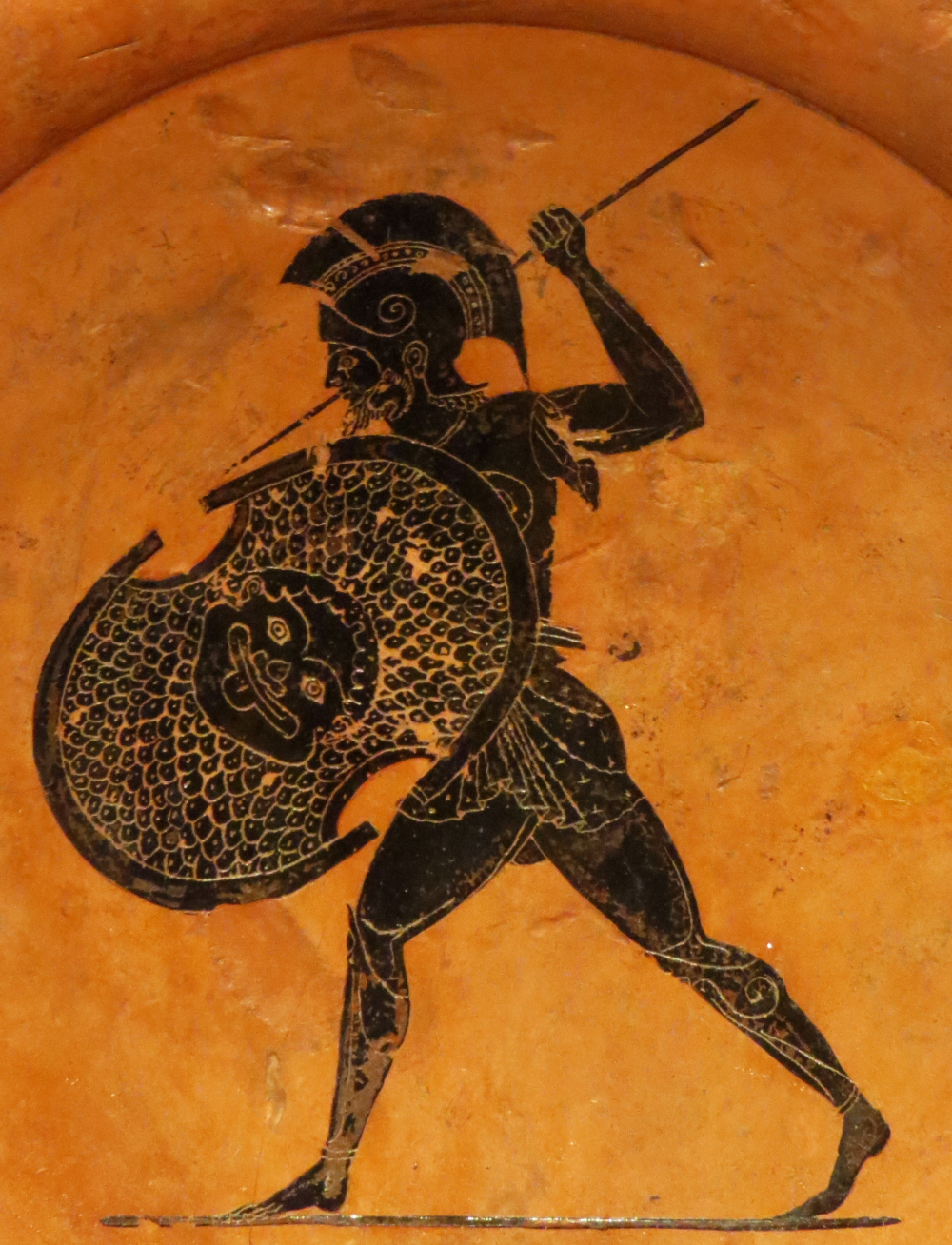
Armoured warrior on a plate acribed to Psiax, circa 510 BC, found in the sanctuary of Zeus at Olympia, Antikensammlung Berlin.

Psiax was an Attic vase painter of the transitional period between the black-figure and red-figure styles. His works date to circa 525 to 505 BC and comprise about 60 surviving vases, two of which bear his signature. Initially he was allocated the name "Menon Painter" by John Beazley. Only later was it realised that the artist was identical with the painters signing as "Psiax".

Psiax collaborated with the potters Hilinos, Menon, Andokides and Nikosthenes. While he started as a painter in the black-figure technique, he played a major role in the early development of red-figure, which was invented in the workshop of Andokides. The black-figure Antimenes Painter, working for the same workshop, was stylistically close to Psiax; Beazley described the two as "brothers". Perhaps unsurprisingly, considering his chronological position, Psiax was a master of bilingual vase painting. Formerly called the Menon Painter, after the potter’s signature on a red-figure amphora (Philadelphia, U. PA, Mus., 5399), he signed two red-figure alabastra as painter, both of which bear the signature of the potter Hilinos [Karlsruhe, Bad. Landesmus., 242 (B 120) and Odessa, A. Mus.]. Psiax also knew the white ground technique, as well as coral red pottery techniques.

His signature is known only from two red-figure alabastra at Karlsruhe and Odessa, both also signed by the potter Hilinos. Three of the vases by him are signed by the potter Andokides. The fact that he painted kyathoi and used the Six's technique indicates that he also collaborated with Nikosthenes. In his early phase, Epiktetos imitated Psiax. The Pioneers Euphronios and Phintias were taught by Psiax.

Psiax mostly painted smaller vessels, appropriate to his fine painting style. Nevertheless, larger vases by him are also known, such as amphorae, hydriai and calyx kraters. On those, too, his figures are not so much powerful and lively but rather dignified and restrained. Although he experimented with the possibilities offered by the new technique (perspective), he concentrated more on the fine detail and decorative effect typical of Late Archaic art. He did not limit his activity to black-figure or red-figure but also experimented with black figures on white or coral-red ground and with the Six Technique.

His choice of subjects is conventional; arguably with a preference for scenes with horses and archers.

== Works (selection) ==
- Brescia, Museo di Santa Giulia

black-figure belly amphora

- Karlsruhe, Baden State Museum

B 120 red-figure alabastron (signed; potter: Hilinos)

- London, British Museum

1980.10-29.1 (formerly Castle Ashby) black-figure neck amphora (potter: Andokides)

Neck front: Dionysos between two satyrs, back: Warrior in chariot in frontal perspective between two youths

- Madrid, National Archaeological Museum of Spain

11008 (L 63) bilingual belly amphora (potter: Andokides)

Front: Apollo with kithara between Artemis, Leto and Ares; back: Dionysos with kantharos between satyrs and maenads

- Malibu, J. Paul Getty Museum

86.AE.278 red-figure cup
90.AE.122 black-figure mastos

- New York City, Metropolitan Museum

63.11.6 red-figure belly amphora with black-figure lip

Front: fight over the tripod, back: Dionysos with kantharos between maenad and satyr (Lip: Psiax, main images: Andokides Painter)

- Odessa, Archaeological Museum

26602 red-figure alabastron (signed; potter: Hilinos)

- Philadelphia, University Museum

5399 red-figure belly amphora (potter: Menon)

== Bibliography ==
- John Beazley: Attic Black-figure Vase-painters. Oxford 1956, p. 292-295. 692.
- John Beazley: Attic Red-Figure Vase-Painters, 2nd. ed. Oxford 1963, p. 6-9.
- John Beazley: Paralipomena. Additions to Attic black-figure vase-painters and to Attic red-figure vase-painters, Oxford 1971, p.
- S. Patitucci Uggeri: Kylix di Psiax in una collezione ticinese, in: Numismatica e antichità classiche. Quaderni ticinesi 1, 1972, p. 33-60.
- Beth Cohen: Attic Bilingual Vases and their Painters, New York 1978, p. 194-239. 276-287.
- Joan R. Mertens: Some new vases by Psiax, in: Antike Kunst 22, 1979, p. 22-37.
- B. Jeske, C. Stein: Eine frührotfigurige Hydria des Psiax, in: Hefte des Archäologischen Seminars der Universität Bern 8, 1982, p. 5-20.
- S. Bonomi: Un nuovo frammento a figure nere di Psiax del Museo di Adria, in: Kotinos. Festschrift für Erika Simon, Mainz 1992, p. 162-164.
- P. Pelletier-Hornby: Deux aspects de Psiax dans la Collection Dutuit du Petit Palais (Musée des beaux-arts de la ville de Paris), in: Revue du Louvre 50, 2000, No. 4, p. 27-37.
- Beth Cohen: Psiax, in: Künstlerlexikon der Antike, Vol. 2, 2004, p. 325-326.

== Sources ==
- The Getty Museum - Biography of Psiax
