= Belly Amphora by the Andokides Painter (Munich 2301) =

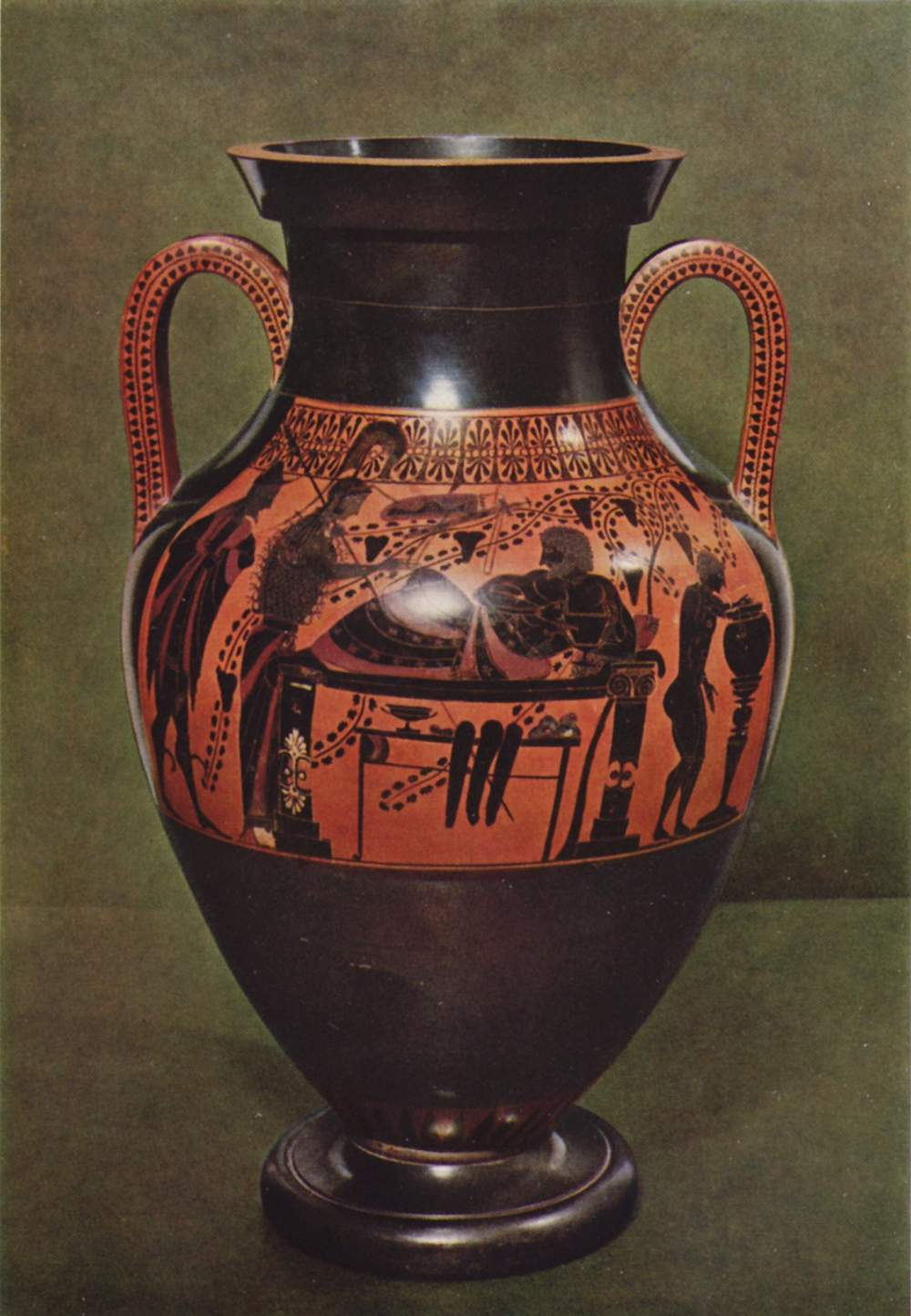
Black-figure side of the amphora.

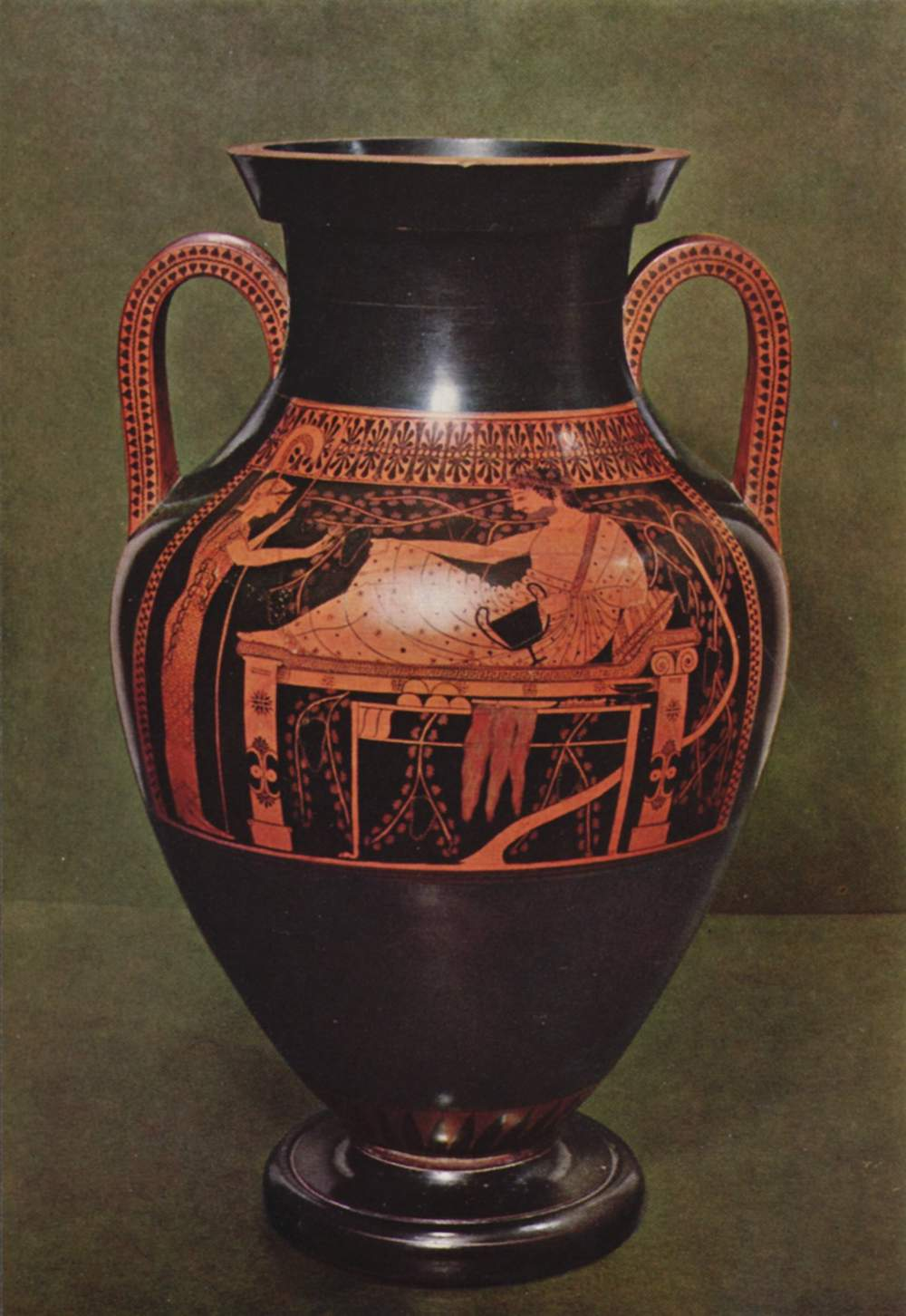
Red-figure side of the amphora.

The Belly Amphora in the Staatliche Antikensammlungen at Munich (inventory number 2301) is one of the most famous works by the Andokides Painter. The vase measures 53.5 cm high and 22.5 cm in diameter. It dates to between 520 and 510 BC and was discovered at Vulci. It was acquired by Martin von Wagner, an agent of Ludwig I of Bavaria.

As a bilingual vase, it is an important archaeological source for the transition from Attic black-figure pottery to the red-figure style. Bilingual vases are uncommon, and ones that repeat the same subject in the two styles are vanishingly rare; the vase is therefore very often used to illustrate the differences between the two techniques. It is signed by the potter Andokides, who probably made it. Some scholars assume that the black-figure side was painted by the Lysippides Painter, while others suggest that he is identical with the Andokides Painter.

== Description ==
The Andokides Painter is generally considered to be the inventor of the red-figure style of Greek vase painting. Red-figure was an inversion of the hitherto common black-figure style. In the initial phase of red-figure painting, both variants were used side by side. In some cases, like the belly amphora described here, both styles were used in separate panels on the front and back of the same vase. This amphora is special because both sides depict the same motif in the two different techniques. Thus, both styles can be compared exemplarily. The scenes depict the most important hero of Greek mythology, Heracles, drinking while reclining on a klinē (couch).

On the black-figure side, he is shown lying in a flat position, holding a drinking cup (kantharos) in his right hand. His gaze is directed towards the goddess Athena, who is standing in front of him. Behind her is Hermes, wearing winged sandals and a hat, followed by a nude servant, depicted slightly smaller, who is mixing wine in a dinos. In front of the couch there is a low table with meat, bread and a kylix. In the background, a vine frames the scene between the hero and the deities. Heracles' weapons are suspended above him, presumably hung on a wall.

The red-figure side differs from the black-figure one in a few regards: The servant and the herald god Hermes are absent, as are the weapons. The scene is framed by vines, but they wind about more. Heracles is depicted with his upper body raised from the couch. One of his hands is holding his knee. The two figures are more isolated than on the other scene. The kantharos is depicted in black, just as it is on the reverse and as a result it stands out much more. Athena is handing Heracles a half-opened flower. The elaborate internal detail renders their clothing much more rich in appearance than on the other side.

== Gallery ==
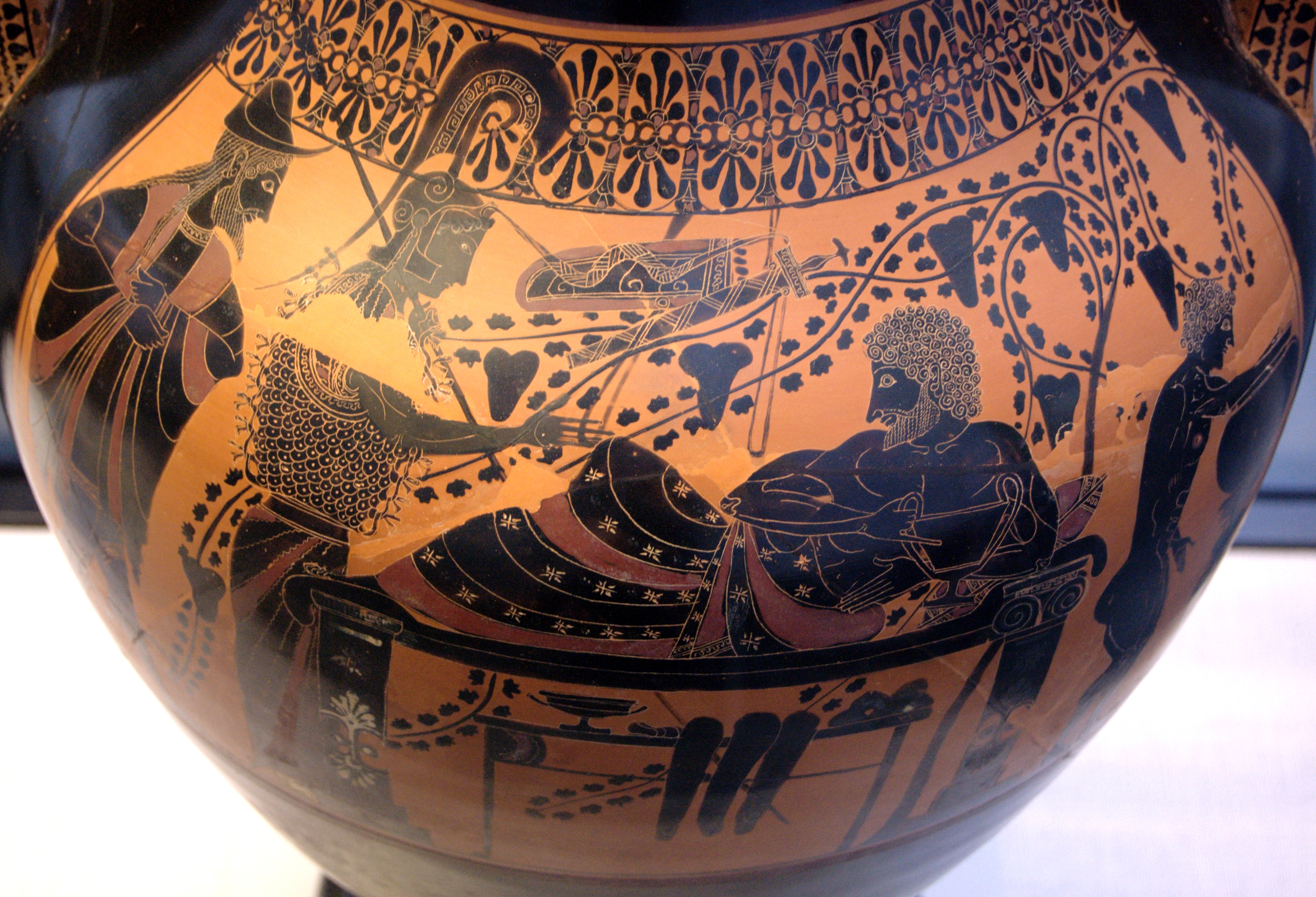
Black-figure side of the amphora, detail.

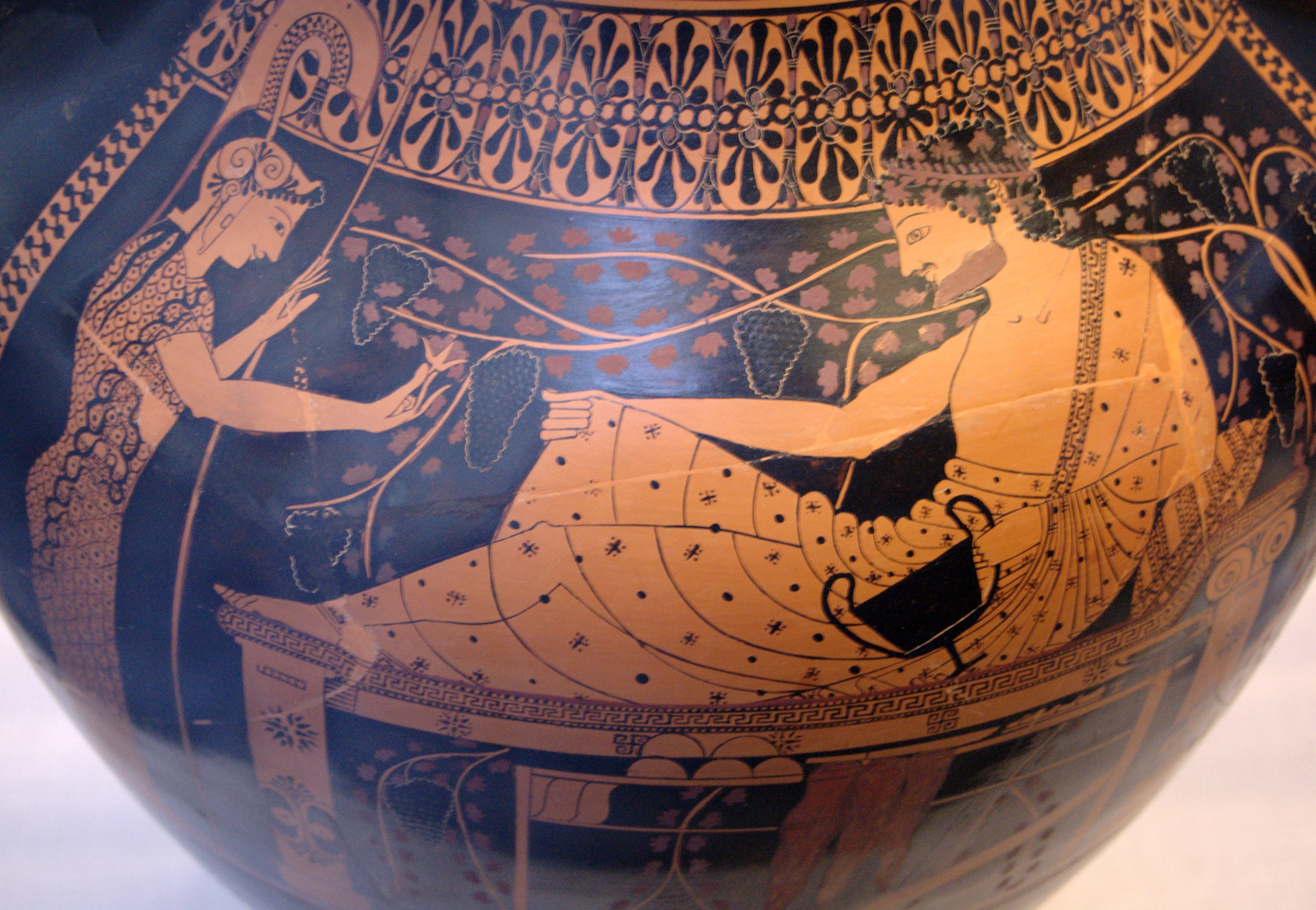
Red-figure side of the amphora, detail.

== See also ==
- Pottery of ancient Greece
- Art in ancient Greece

== Literature ==
- Michael Siebler: Griechische Kunst, Taschen, Köln u.a. 2007, p. 46f. ISBN 978-3-8228-5447-1
