= Oltos =

Late 6th century BC Athenian vase painter

- Occupation: Vase painter
- Years active: c.525 BC to c. 500 BC
- Style: Initially bilingual, later red-figure

Oltos was a Late Archaic Greek vase painter, active in Athens from 525 BC to 500 BC. About 150 works by him are known. Two pieces, a cup in Berlin (Antikensammlung F 2264) and a cup in Tarquinia (Museo Nazionale Tarquiniese RC 6848), are signed by him as painter.

== Overview ==
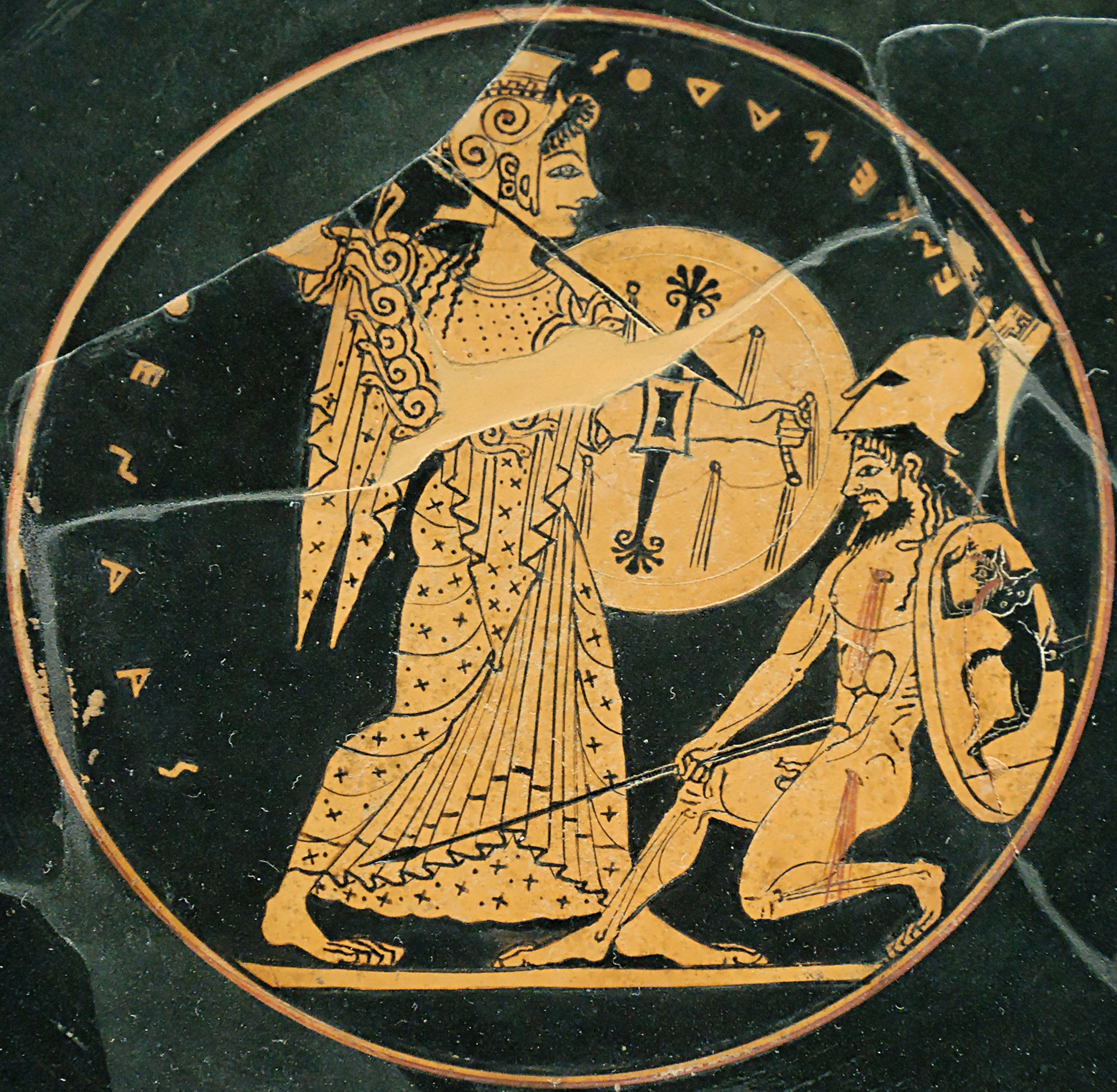
Athena and Enceladus in combat, red-figure plate, Louvre CA 3662.

Oltos is thought to have begun his career in the workshop of the potter Nikosthenes. Initially, he mainly painted bilingual vases or bowls with interior black-figure and exterior red-figure decoration. His black-figure style was influenced by Psiax and the Antimenes Painter. No pure black-figure works by Oltos are yet known. His tondos usually depict a single figure. They are often full of tension, frequently with differential directions of gaze and movement. Later, he exclusively painted red-figure, influenced especially by the Andokides Painter as well as several members of the Pioneer Group, especially his former pupil Euphronios.

His drawing style was spacious and elegant, but never reached the depth of detail of his most important contemporary masters. He had a distinctive tendency towards luxurious ornamentation and symmetric compositions. In the middle of his career he concentrated especially on the depiction of mythological scenes. Over time, he worked with several different potters. We know of at least six: Hischylos, most importantly Pamphaios, with whom he created the earliest known stamnos, Tleson, Chelis, and finally Kachrylion, for whom he worked together with Euphronios, as well as Euxitheos.

An innovation introduced by Oltos is found on an amphora at London (British Museum E 258). Here, he depicts a single figure, with no frame or floor line.

== Selected works ==
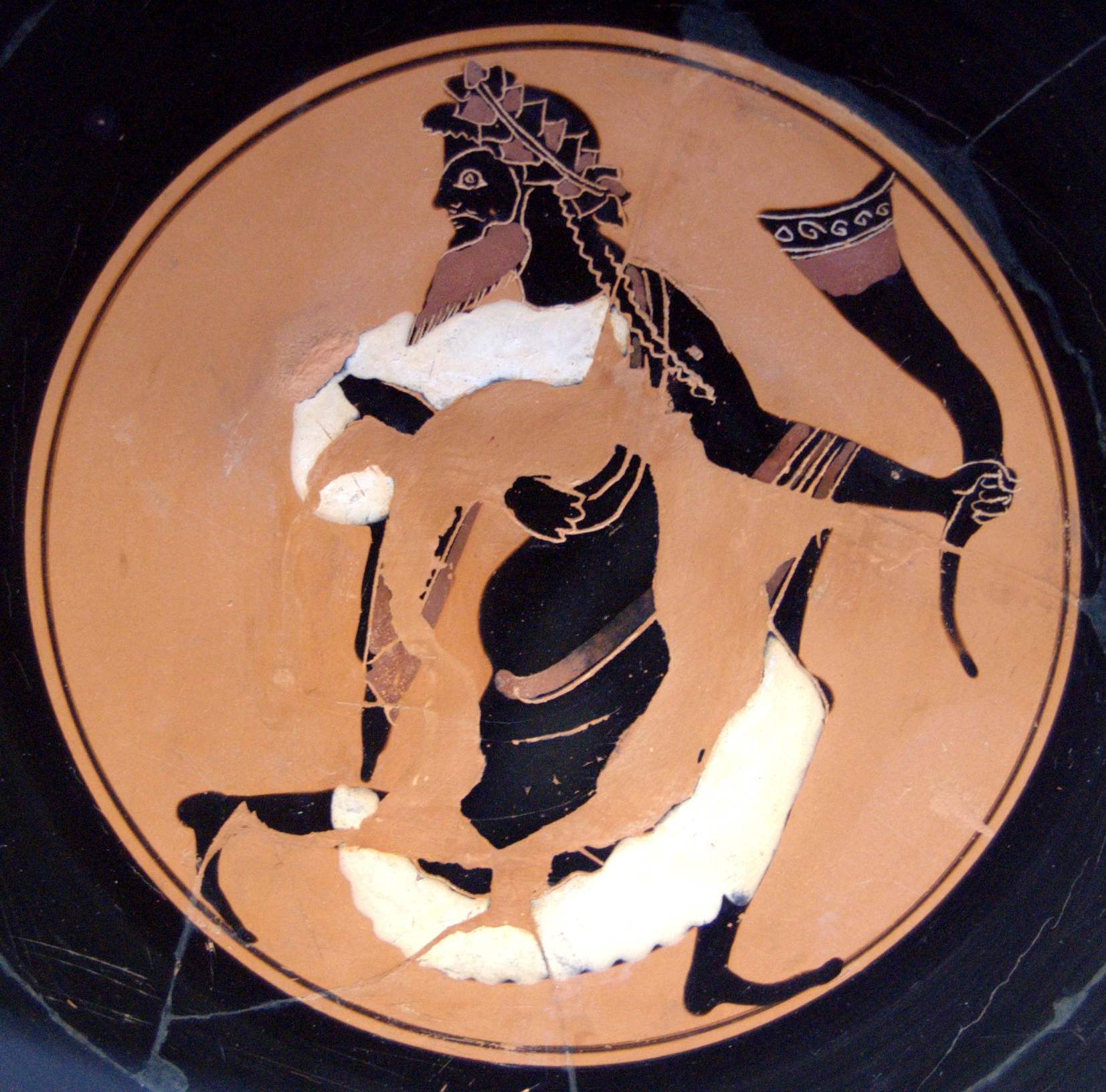
Dionysos, interior image from a bilingual cup (A), Munich, Staatliche Antikensammlungen (Inv. 2593).

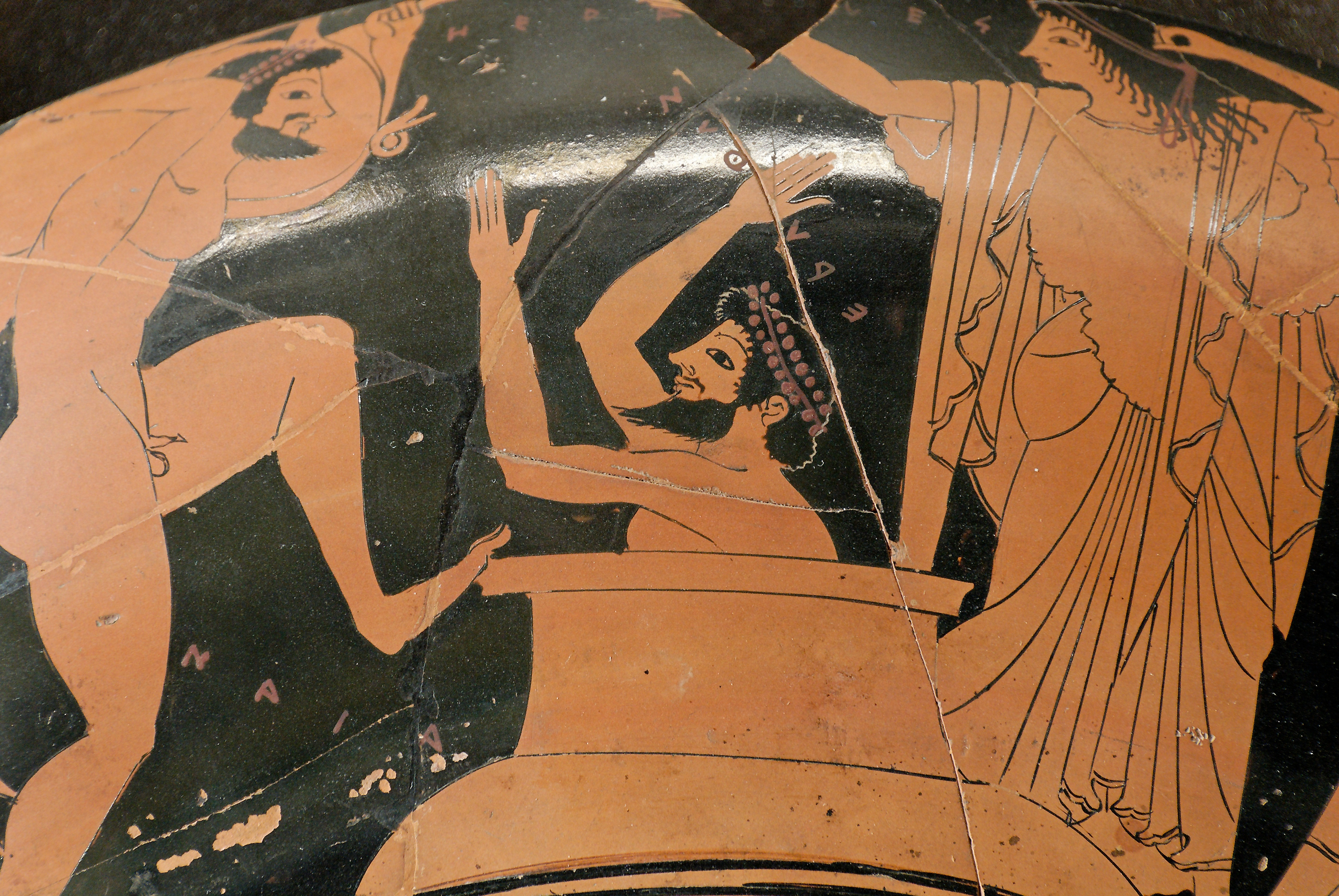
Eurystheus hiding in a jar as Herakles brings him the Erymanthian boar. Side A from a red-figure kylix by Oltos, ca. 510 BC, Paris, Louvre (G17).

- Altenburg, Staatliches Lindenau-Museum – bowl 224
- Baltimore, Johns Hopkins University Museum – fragment of a kylix AIA B1
- Basel, Antikensammlung and Sammlung Ludwig – bowl BS 459
- Berlin, Antikensammlung – bowl F 2263 • bowl F 2264 • phiale F 2310 • bowl F 4220 • bowl F 4221
- Boston, Museum of Fine Arts – kylix 13.83 • fragment of a kylix 08.31d • fragment 10.219
- Brunswick, Bowdoin College Museum of Art – fragment of a kylix 1913.14
- Chicago, University of Chicago (David and Alfred Smart Gallery) – kylix 1967.115
- Fayetteville, The University Museum – kylix 56.25.15
- London, The British Museum – kylix E 41 • amphora E 258 • stamnos E 437
- Malibu, J. Paul Getty Museum – kylix 86.AE.276 • kylix 86.AE.277
- Mount Holyoke, Mount Holyoke College Art Museum – kylix 1967.BS.II.11
- Munich, Staatliche Antikensammlungen – bowl 25 93 • bowl 2618
- New York, Metropolitan Museum of Art – psykter 1989.281.69
- Paris, Musée National du Louvre – fragment CA 3662 • amphora G 2 • amphora G 3
- Tarquinia, Museo Nazionale Tarquiniese – bowl RC 6848
- Vatican, Museo Gregoriano Etrusco Vaticano – bowl 498
- Parma, Museo Archeologico Nazionale – kylix (520-510 b.C)

== Bibliography ==
- Joachim Harnecker: Oltos. Untersuchungen zu Themenwahl und Stil eines früh-rotfigurigen Schalenmalers, Lang, Frankfurt a. M. u. a. 1992, ISBN 3-631-43755-2
