= Kachrylion =

Late 6th/early 5th-century Greek red-figure potter

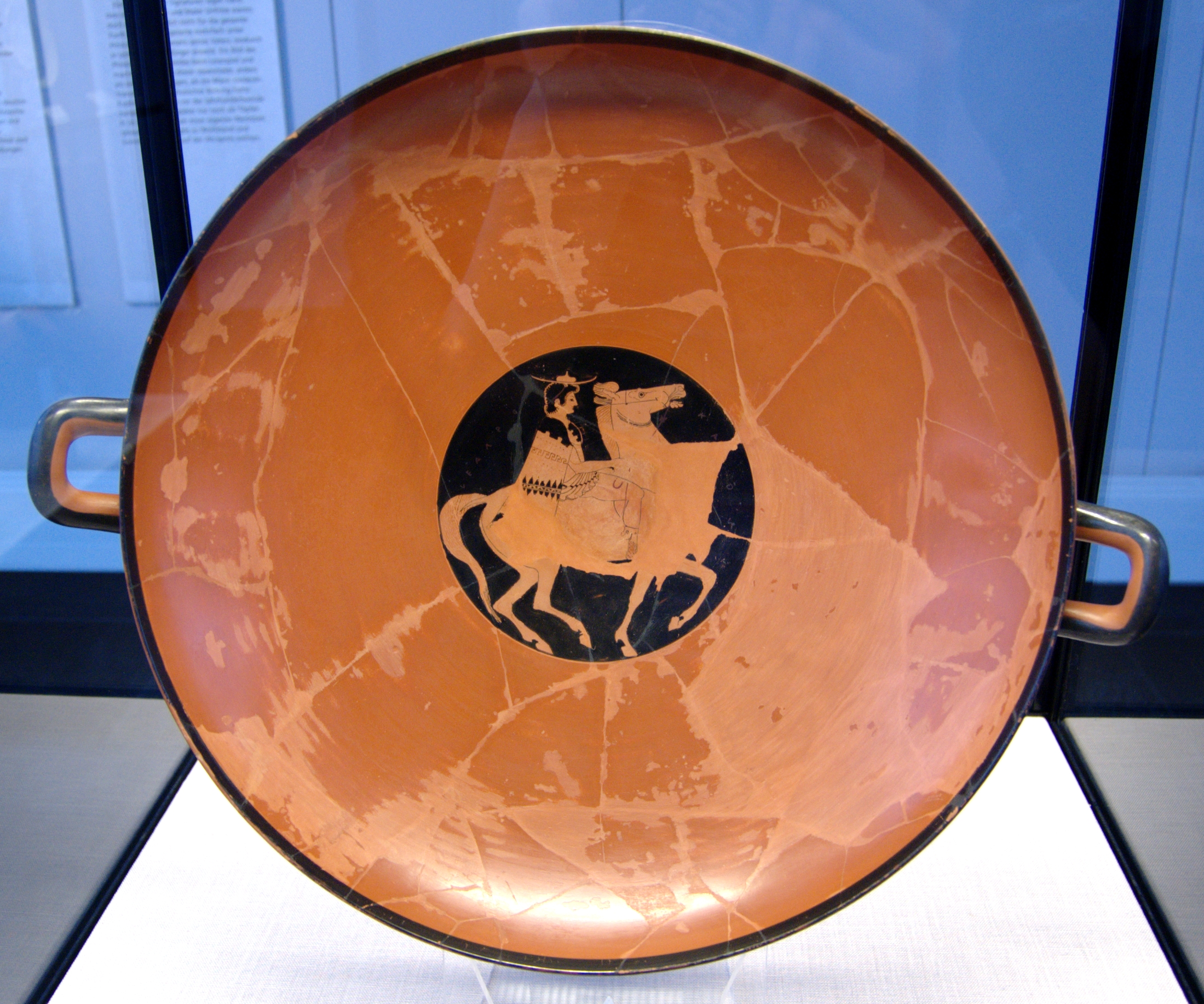
Rider on a red-figure kylix by Kachrylion and Euphronios

Kachrylion was a potter of Greek red-figure pottery at the end of the 6th and the beginning of the 5th century BC. At his pottery had worked some of the most important Attic-Greek vase painters of these times, such as Euphronios and Oltos. He signed 29 kylixes and one plate.

== Literature ==
- John Beazley: Attic Red-figure Vase-painters 2nd ed. Oxford 1963, S. 107-109.
