= Epiktetos =

Greek vase painter active between 520 and 490 BCE

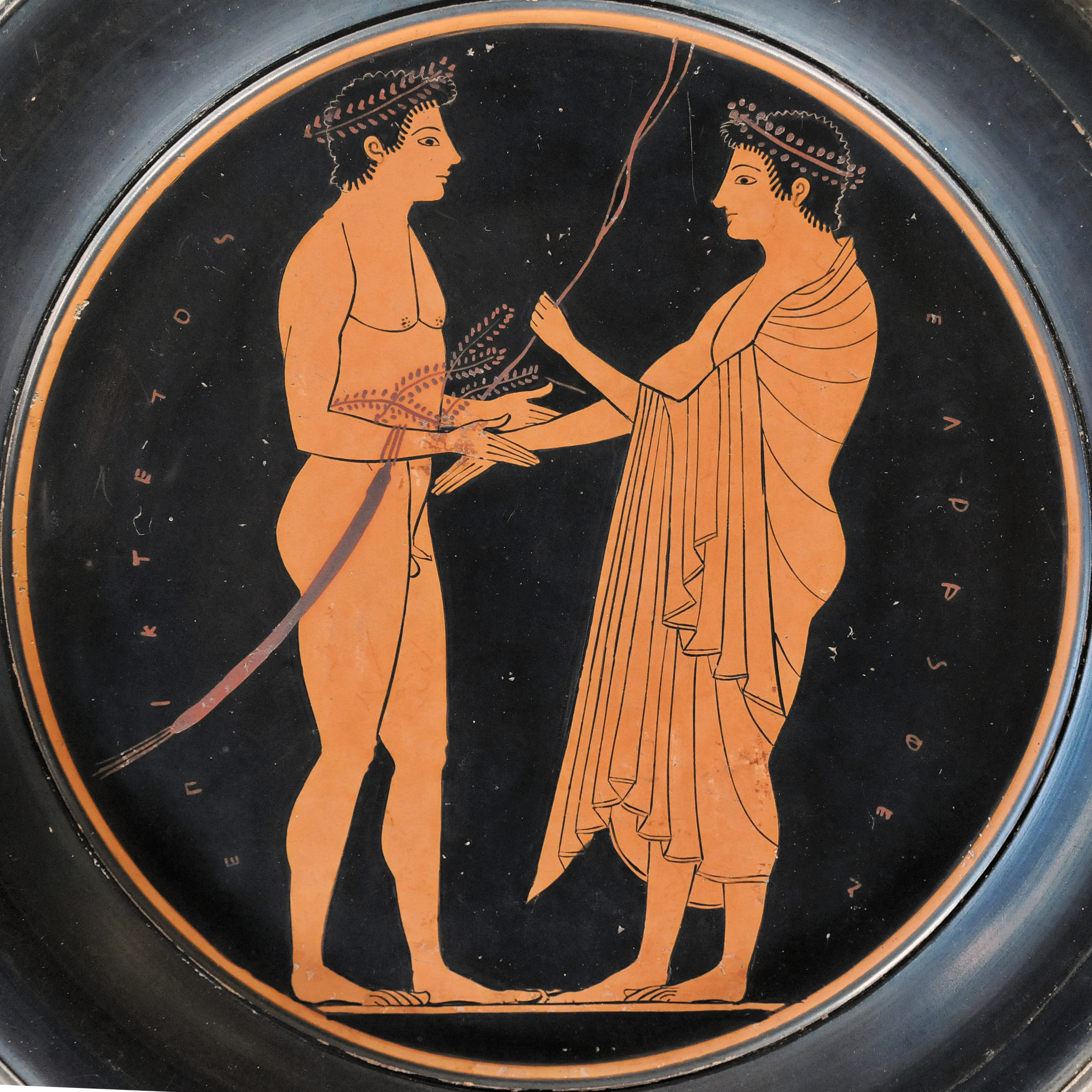
Palaistra scene on a plate, about 520/10 BCE. Louvre.

Epiktetos was an Attic vase painter in the early red-figure style. Besides Oltos, he was the most important painter of the Pioneer Group. He was active between 520 BCE and 490 BCE. His name translates as "newly acquired", which is most probably a reference to his slave status.

== Career ==
At the beginning of his career, Epiktetos painted a chalice krater made by the potter Andokides, but later he turned to smaller vessels, such as cups and plates. Throughout his long career, he worked for a variety of potters, including Andokides, Hischylos and the Nikosthenes-Pamphaios workshop. Since he signed one plate as painter and potter, he may have carried out both functions at least for some of the time. That plate was a votive offering, dedicated on the Athenian Acropolis. On one kylix, he collaborated with the Euergides Painter. He appears to have been aware of his talent, as he signed more than half of the works ascribed to him.

His first vases were bilingual eye-cups. The eight bilingual cups were painted using two techniques: the black-figure technique on the interior, largely focusing on animal designs in circular formations, and the red-figure painting technique on the exterior, showcasing designs of palmettes, eyes, and occasionally figures. Already at this stage, he was technically superior to the early works of Oltos, and omitted out-of-date features such as palmette-hearts. He also used the relief-line technique. Epiktetos was considered a master of the tondo (circular image inside a cup). Often his vases were only painted on the inside. His miniature drawings were delicate and precise. His use of colour and ornament was careful and controlled. His lines and details were very balanced, with heads and limbs well-proportioned. His use of perspective on figures was very convincing. John Beazley praised Epiktetos: "it is not possible to draw better, only to draw differently". John Boardman also lauded him as the "greatest draughtsman in early red-figure vase painting".

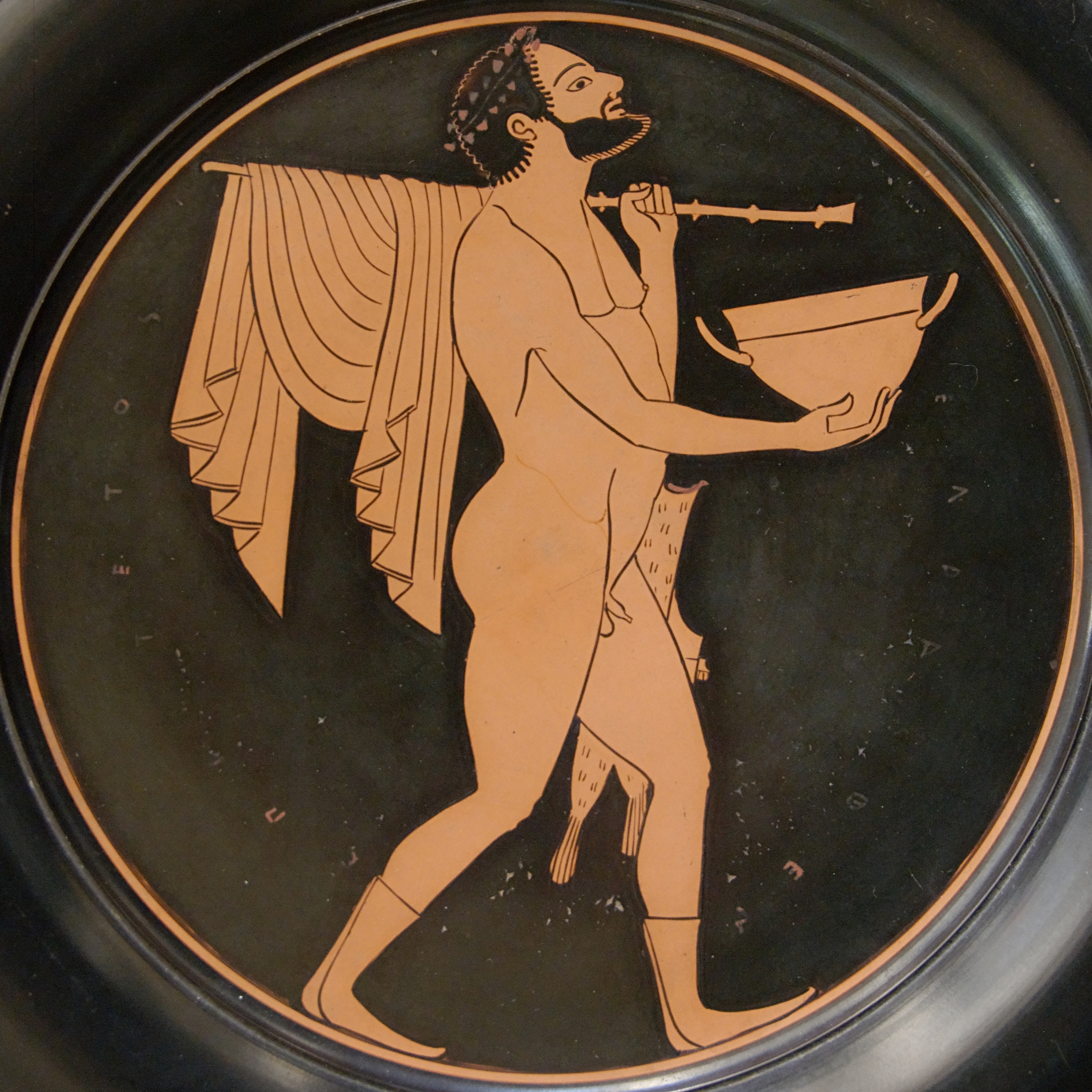
Komast with a skyphos, a staff and pipes case, tondo from a red-figure plate by Epiktetos, ca. 520s BCE–500s BCE, from Vulci, Cabinet des Médailles (n.510).

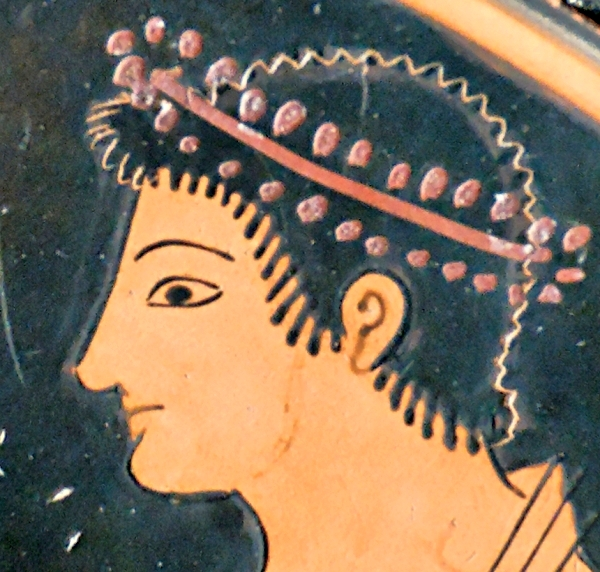
Details of a head in the scene above

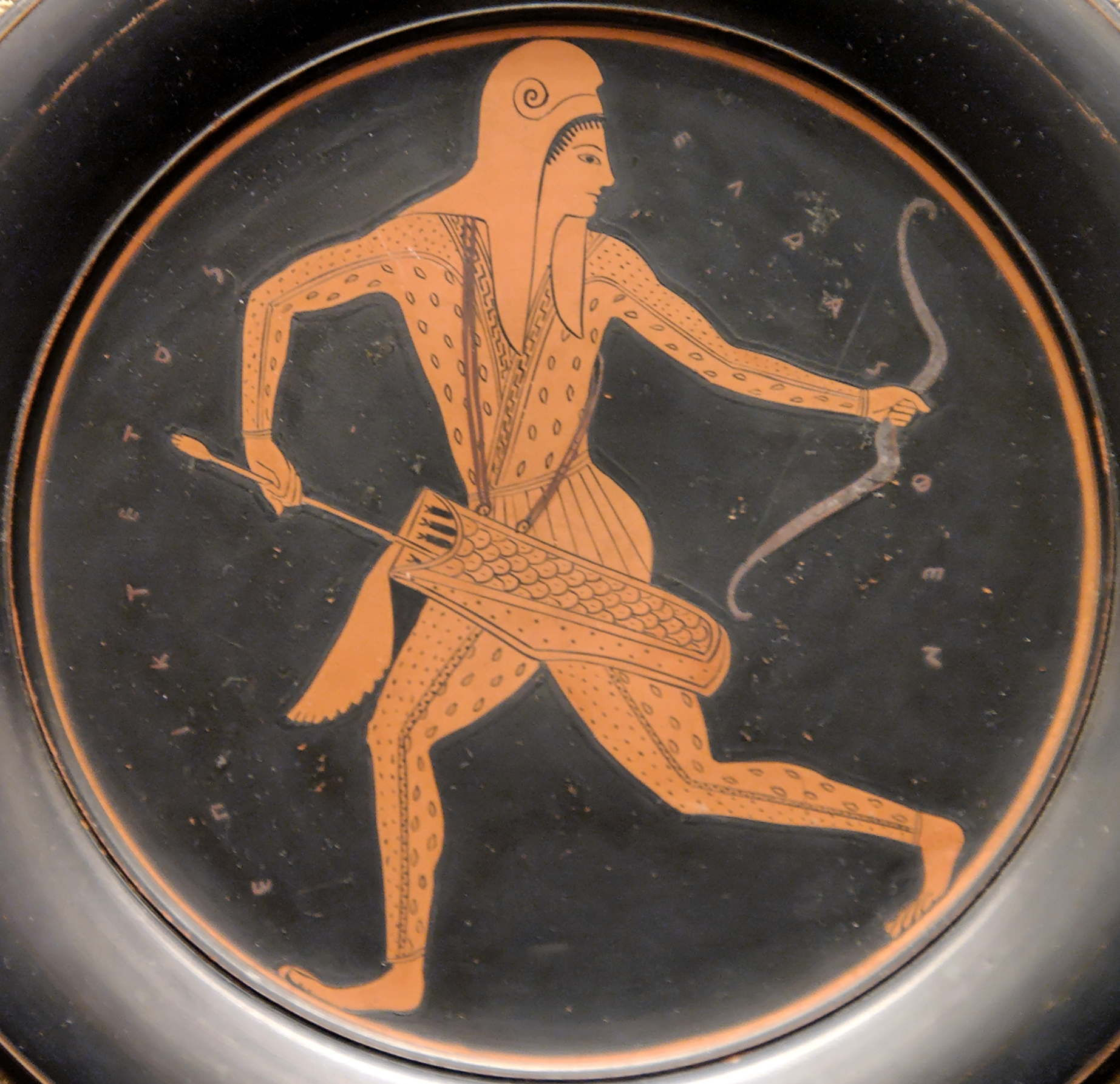
Scythian archer, running while looking backwards and pulling an arrow from his quiver, cup, circa 520–500 BCE. British Museum

He preferred scenes of daily life and revelry to mythological scenes. He rarely depicted mythological scenes, which usually lacked originality. In contrast, his everyday scenes demonstrated his skills and his innovative ideas. He showed Athenian citizens at play, at the symposion and in erotic scenes, where he develops new aspects and motifs. He played an important role in the development of the satyr as a figure expressing beast like masculinity. His tondi ceased to depict the kneeling runner characteristic of black-figure vase painting; instead his figures squat, kneel or were seated. In some cases, the postures of figures depicted on his vases were nearly identical, even if their actions varied greatly. For example, a bent and twisted figure was in one case the Minotaur, in another a man masturbating into a pot and, in a third, a girl pleasuring herself with a dildo.

The end of his career remains unclear. One of his last works was on a cup by the potter Python – here he appeared stylistically influenced by Python's main painter, Douris – another on a vase by Pistoxenos. Epiktetos's work must have been greatly appreciated at the time, as indicated by a pelike by the Kleophrades Painter which was twice falsely signed Epiktetos egraphsen (Epiktetos painted it). The signature was a forgery, suggesting that the vessel was considered more marketable if considered to be by Epiktetos.

== Bibliography ==
- John Beazley: Attic red-figure vase-painters, 2nd ed. Oxford 1963, p. 70-79
- John Boardman: Rotfigurige Vasen aus Athen. Die archaische Zeit, von Zabern, 4. Ed., Mainz 1994 (Kulturgeschichte der Antiken Welt, Vol 4), esp. S. 64-66, ISBN 3-8053-0234-7
