= Painter of Nicosia Olpe =

Ancient Greek vase painter

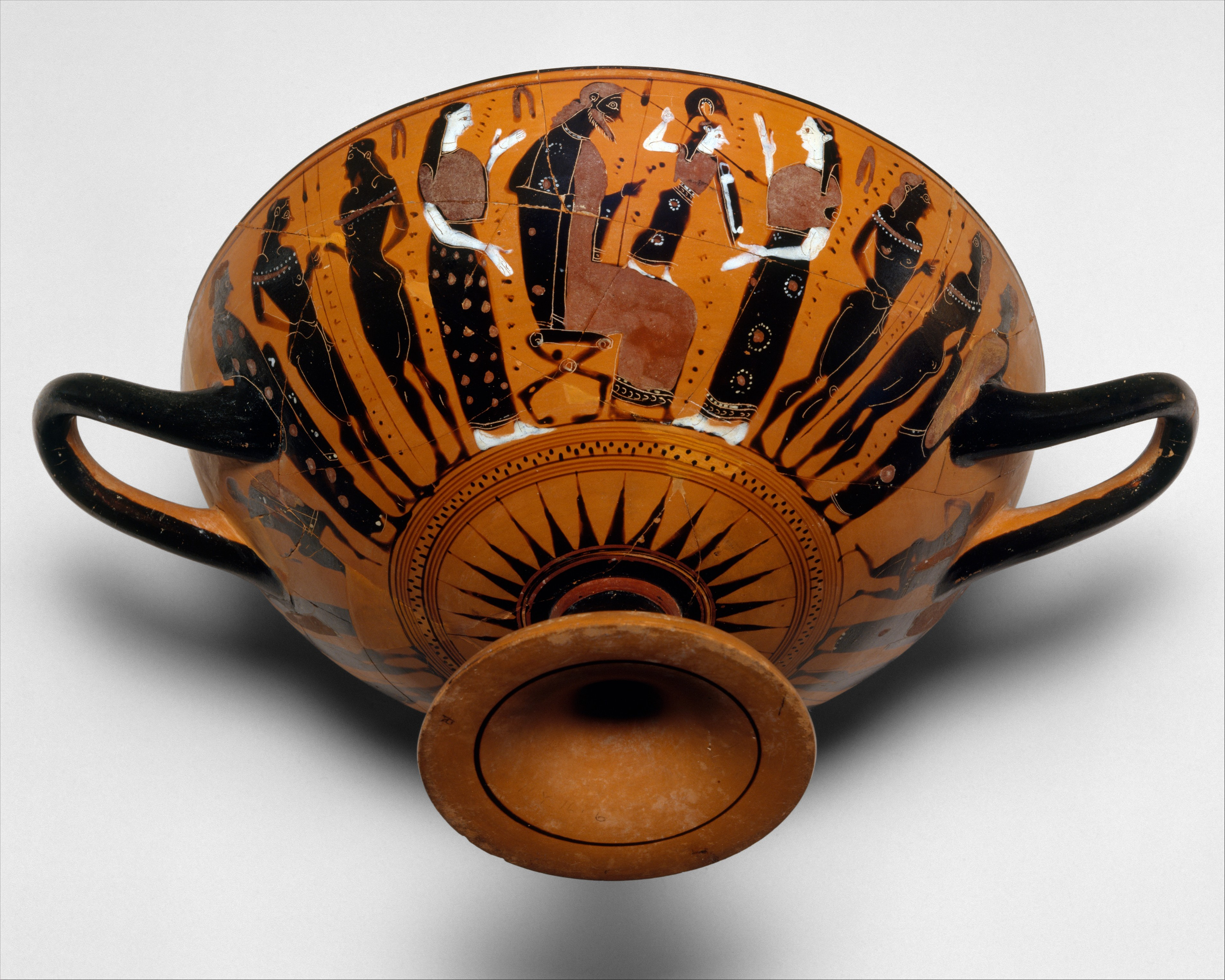
Attic terracotta kylix (drinking cup), ca. 550 BC; Metropolitan Museum of Art, New York City

The Painter of Nicosia Olpe was an ancient Greek vase painter, who was producing work around 575 BC to 475 BC, and these dates are concluded from the vases that were found and attributed to the specific painter. All of the pieces are black-figure, and this can also be determined by the dates. The majority of vases that he painted were larger pieces; this is not something that he had control over, but he did have control over the scenes on the vases.

== Works ==
There are forty-five vases that are attributed to the Painter of Nicosia Olpe that are recorded and posted on the Beazley Archive. Out of those forty-five vases more than half are larger vase shapes such as amphora, amphora B, neck amphora, skyphos, and more. These large vases were found mostly in Italy, which means that most of the vases that the painter and workshop were producing were for the Italian market. Twelve of the forty-five vases were found in different parts of Italy such as Etruria, Capua, Nola, Taranto and South Italy as well. With the number of vases going to Italy one can conclude that there was a great need for large vases in Italy. There is a great number of larger vases being produced by the workshop, which means that the painter was able to draw and paint larger scenes of his choice. In this case the painter chose to mainly focus on departure scenes, and scenes of the God Dionysus with maenads and satyrs. There are two types of departure scenes that include horsemen or a chariot, however both of the types have youths and women.

== Style ==
The first type of departure scene is of men and youths getting ready to leave for the battlefield, leaving their families behind. The painter took full advantage of the size of the vase, because he chose to paint the horses from a side view, which uses more of the surface area on the vase. On the sides of the horse the painter has drawn youths and women holding spears for the warrior that is leaving. The women are painted in white paint, and the men and youths are in black. The second type of departure scene is of a full chariot and the horsemen with women and youths holding spears on the side of the chariot. The horses that are pulling the chariot are drawn in a frontal manner, meaning the faces of the horses are facing the on looker of the vase.

The second theme that is very prevalent in the drawings that the painter of Nicosia Olpe did is of the God Dionysus with maenads and satyrs. Dionysus is the god of fertility in nature and also the god of wine, this is why he is usually depicted holding a gourd or a cup of some sort. Maenads are feminine creatures that are always dancing with satyrs who are masculine creatures that have tails and beards. Within these scenes Dionysus is the central figure, and surrounding him maenads and satyrs who are dancing around him as well.

== Related painters ==
These themes of departure and Dionysus with maenads and satyrs are not only specific to the Painter of Nicosia Olpe; there are other painters that paint these scenes. The fact that the painter has many departure and Dionysus themed scenes are details to note but this is not an attribute that can help differentiate that painter from other painters of his time. What is specific to the Painter of Nicosia Olpe is the way he draws eyes, and this also applies to horses and other creatures such as satyrs not only to men and women. The eyes are not very elaborately drawn, it seems as if the painter drew a circle and two lines on the sides. These themes and characteristics can also help find which other painters and workshops the Painter of Nicosia Olpe may have been associated, or related to. The Painter of Louvre F 28 uses the same technique of drawing eyes; they are closely related. Another painter that uses this same technique is the Painter of Ure's Type A. The eyes are down in a similar manner however the way the noises are drawn different. The Painter of Nicosia Olpe has a more rounded noise and the Painter of Ure's Type A has drawn a more pointed noise. A third painter or group that is associated is the group of Brussels R 300. The Painter of Nicosia Olpe and the group of Brussels R 300 share the theme of Dionysus. The major difference between the two is that the group of Brussels R 300 has the maenads and satyrs moving. The action of dancing is clearly seen within the scene, because the feet of the maenads and satyrs are in a pose shows that they are moving.
