= Andokides (vase painter) =

Ancient Athenian vase painter

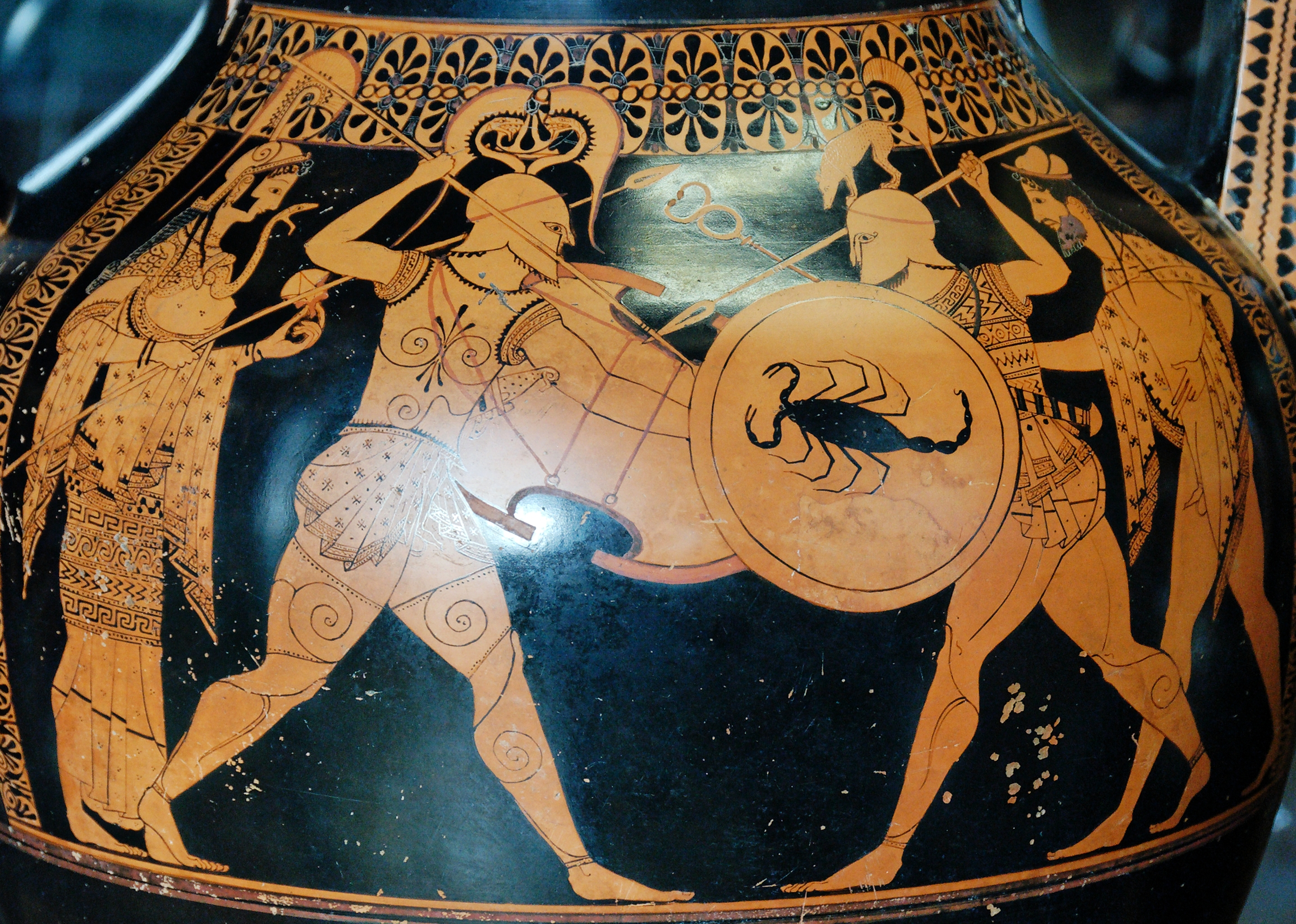
Hoplites with Athena and Hermes. Side A from an Attic red-figure amphora, c. 530 BC, from Vulci. Louvre Museum, Paris.

Andokides was an ancient Athenian vase painter, active from approximately 530 to 515 BC. His work is unsigned and his true name unknown. He was identified as a unique artistic personality through stylistic traits found in common among several paintings. This corpus was then attributed by John D. Beazley to the Andokides Painter, a name derived from the potter Andokides, whose signature appears on several of the vases bearing the painter's work. He is often credited with being the originator of the red-figure vase painting technique. To be sure, he is certainly one of the earliest painters to work in the style. In total, fourteen amphorae and two cups are attributed to his hand. Six of the amphorae are "bilingual", meaning they display both red-figure and black-figure scenes.

== Biography ==
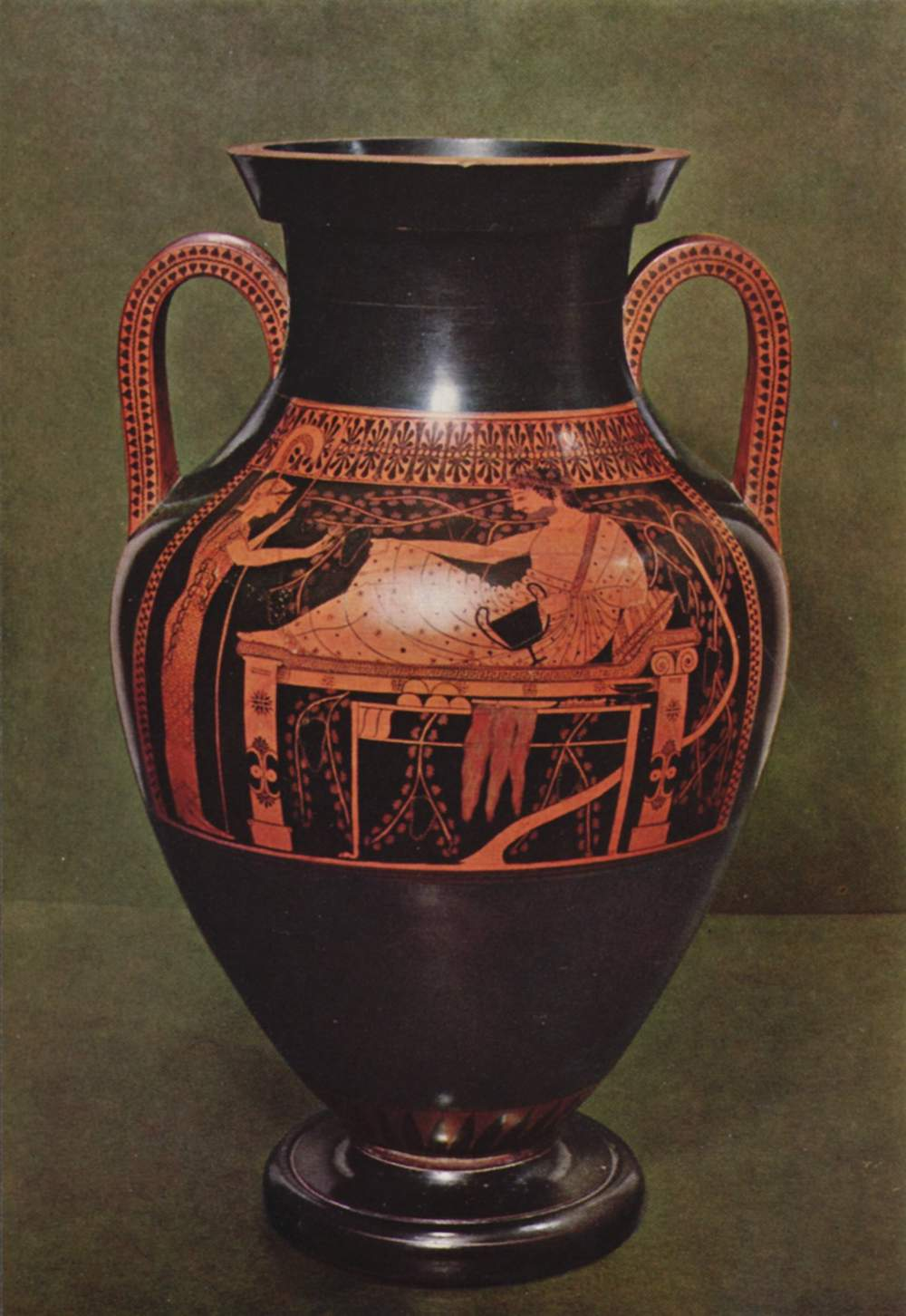
Herakles and Athena. Side A of an Attic red-figure bilingual amphora painted by Andokides, c. 520 BC, from Vulci. Staatliche Antikensammlung, Munich, inv. 2301.

Several details regarding the artistic biography of the Andokides Painter have been suggested through connoisseurial studies of his work. As mentioned, he is widely thought to be the creator of the red-figure painting technique. It is likely, however, that he also worked in black-figure painting, and his style suggests a link, possibly in the role of student, to the great black-figure painter Exekias. John Boardman sees connections to Ionian art in the painter's work, suggesting that he may have been an immigrant from East Greece. Dietrich von Bothmer also notes that the earliest instances of the use of a white ground in vase painting occur in the Andokides Painter's scenes, perhaps indicating that he should be credited additionally with inventing the white ground technique.

== The emergence of red-figure painting ==
The invention of the red-figure technique occurred sometime around 525 BC. The evidence for this date lies in the connections between the Andokides Painter's work and a datable monument: the Siphnian Treasury at Delphi. The frieze of the Treasury shows certain stylistic and compositional innovations, such as the introduction of three-quarter views and foreshortening, which parallel developments in the new red-figure painting, most especially in images by the Andokides Painter. Additionally, certain subjects depicted on the Treasury, like the struggle for the Delphic tripod, are not generally found in Attic painting until the Andokides Painter's red-figure scenes. The relationship between the Treasury and the Andokides Painter's work is so strong, that some scholars have posited the vase painter was somehow involved in the frieze's production, perhaps as a colorist.

== Bilingual vases and the debate over attribution ==
The Andokides Painter has always featured prominently in scholarly debates over the attribution of bilingual vases. The dispute centers on the question of authorship of the black-figure paintings: whether each scene was produced by a different artist, or if the same hand painted both scenes in both techniques. The question was first raised by Adolf Furtwängler, who suggested that the paintings were realized by two separate hands. Beazley changed his mind over the matter several times during his career, specifically in relation to works he attributed to the Andokides Painter. He eventually came to the conclusion that two artists were involved in the production of the vases, the Andokides Painter painted the red-figure pictures and another artist, whom he named the Lysippides Painter, produced the black-figure pictures. Many scholars, however, have resisted this conclusion and question whether the Andokides Painter and the Lysippides Painter are in fact one and the same.

The uncertainty surrounding the issue was convincingly dispelled, however, through studies undertaken by Beth Cohen and Elizabeth Simpson. Beth Cohen in her publication Attic Bilingual Vases and Their Painters, produced a definitive study of the bilingual vase form. She closely observed certain details, drawing styles, themes, compositions, and preferences in order to establish artistic personalities, a chronology of the vases, and the relationship of the scenes to one another. Her conclusions demonstrated that the Lysippides Painter and the Andokides Painter were distinct, that shared details among the paintings were the result of collaboration, and that the black-figure images were a self-contained corpus that was not produced by the painter of the red-figure scenes. Elizabeth Simpson in her article "The Andokides Painter and Greek Carpentry" further settled the debate by demonstrating a key difference between the painters of the red-figure and black-figure images on vase Munich 2301. In each, the hero Herakles is shown reclining on a Greek couch or kline. How the couch is depicted reveals an essential difference between the renderings. In the red-figure painting, details of the couch indicate the Andokides Painter had a thorough working knowledge of carpentry practices: tenons and rails are accurately depicted, conforming to woodworking practices and known ancient forms. The black-figure scene, however, lacks the same precision and accuracy. Rails and tenons are depicted in inappropriate locations, resulting in a construction that would not have been structurally sound. A small table also included in the scene shows the same disparities. This discrepancy clearly indicates two artistic personalities at work: one who had an understanding of carpentry and furniture construction, and one who did not.

== Works ==
Name	Images	Dimensions	Type	Date	Description	Museum Record
Berlin, Antikensammlung
F 2159		H. 58.2 cm.	Belly Amphora	c. 525 BC	Herakles and the Delphic Tripod; Wrestlers	Perseus
Bologna, Museo Civico
---			Amphora		A: Herakles and the Nemean Lion; B: Dionysos	
London, British Museum
B 193		H. 54.6 cm	Belly Amphora	c. 520 BC	A: Achilles and Ajax; B: Herakles and Nemean Lion	Record
Munich, Staatliche Antikensammlungen
2301		H. 53.5 cm D. 22.5 cm	Belly Amphora	520–510 BC	A: Herakles feasting B: Herakles feasting	
Paris, Louvre
F 203		H: 40.5 cm D: 25.2 cm	Amphora	530–520 BC	A: Amazons; B: Bathing women	Perseus
F 204		H. 58.20 cm; D. 37.50 cm	Amphora	530–520 BC	A: Herakles and Kerberos	
G1		H. 57.2 cm; D. 36.6 cm	Amphora	525–520 BC	A: Hoplite battle; B: Citharode	Perseus

== See also ==
- List of Greek vase painters
