= Staatliche Antikensammlungen =

Art museum in Munich, Germany

Coordinates: 48°08′42″N 11°33′53″E

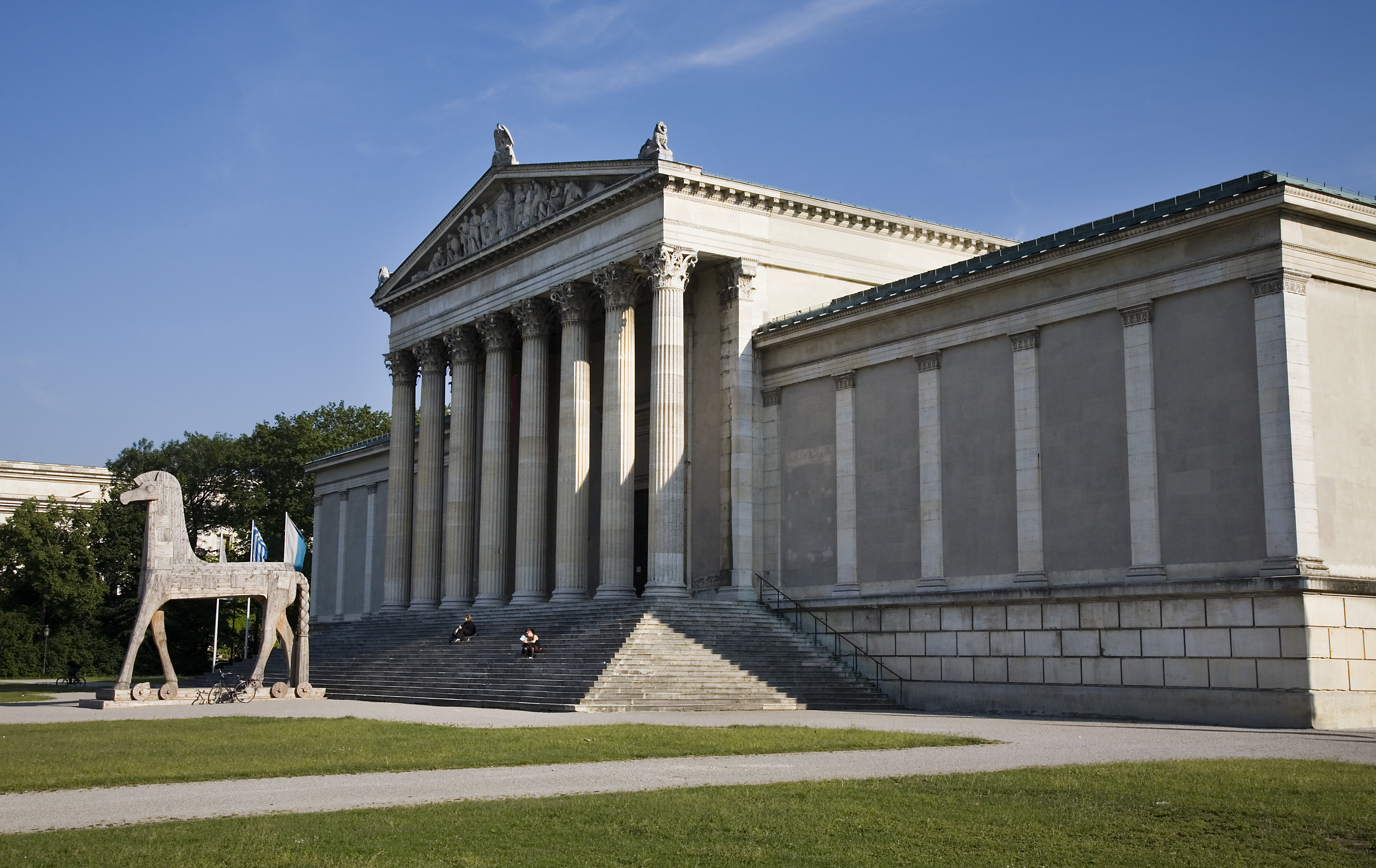
- Bavarian State Collection of Antiques
- Established: 1848; 178 years ago
- Location: Munich, Bavaria, Germany
- Type: Art museum
- Founder: Ludwig I
- Director: Florian Knauß
- Owner: Free State of Bavaria
- Public transit access: Königsplatz
- Website: Official website

The Staatliche Antikensammlungen (German: [ˈʃtaːtlɪçə anˈtiːkənˌzamlʊŋən], State Collections of Antiquities) is a museum in Munich's Kunstareal holding Bavaria's collections of antiquities from Greece, Etruria and Rome, though the sculpture collection is located in the Glyptothek opposite, and works created in Bavaria are on display in a separate museum. Ancient Egypt also has its own museum.

== History of the building ==
The neo-classical building in Königsplatz with Corinthian columns was established in 1848 as a counterpart to the Glyptothek opposite, and commissioned by King Ludwig I of Bavaria. The architect was Georg Friedrich Ziebland. From 1869 to 1872 the building already housed the royal antiquarium. Later, the Munich Secession resided here from 1898 to 1912. From 1919 the building contained the New State Gallery. The museum building was severely damaged by bombing in World War II but was reconstructed and reopened to the public in the late 1960s to display the State Collection of Antiques.

== Collections ==
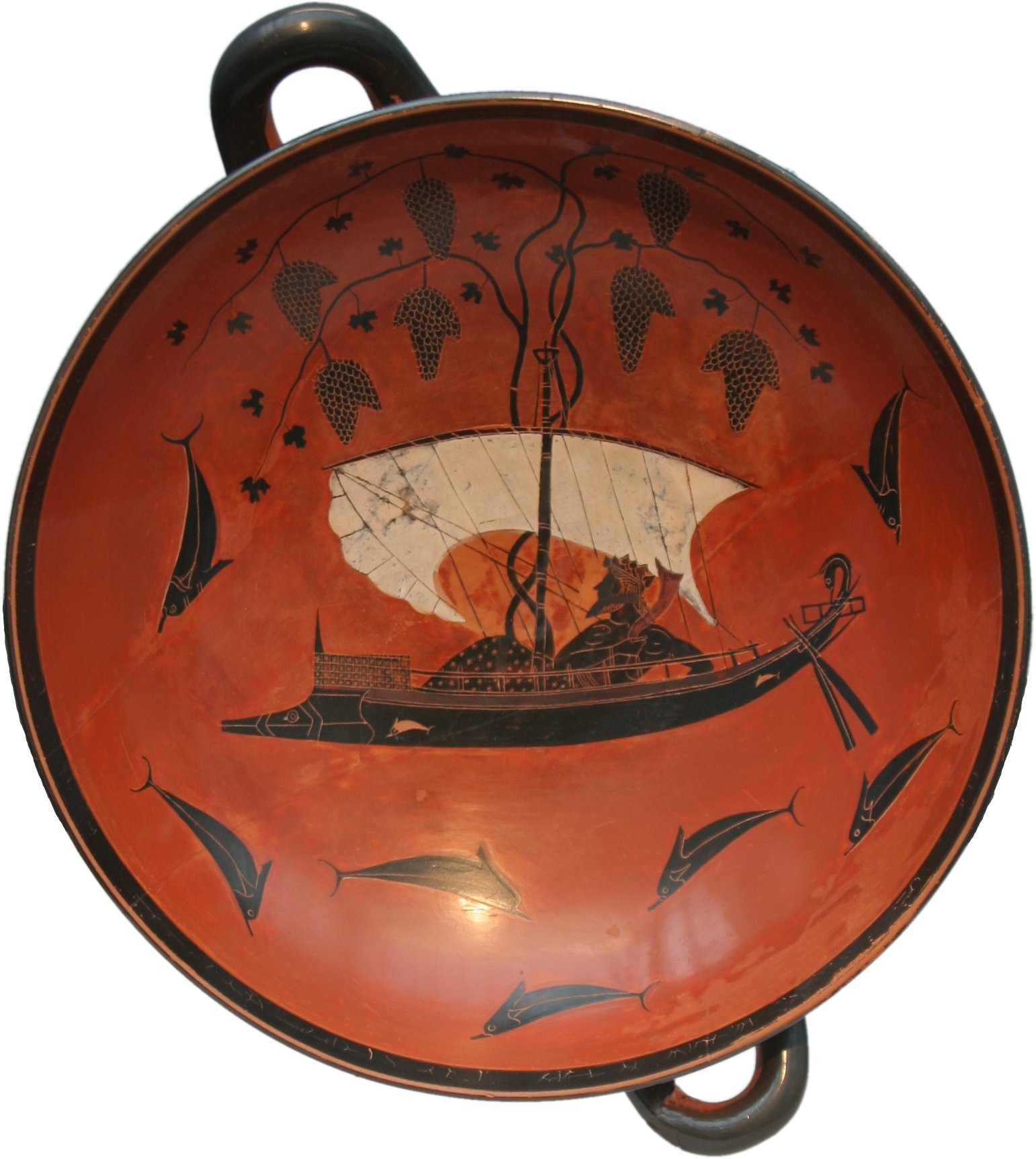
Dionysus cup by Exekias (circa 530 BC)

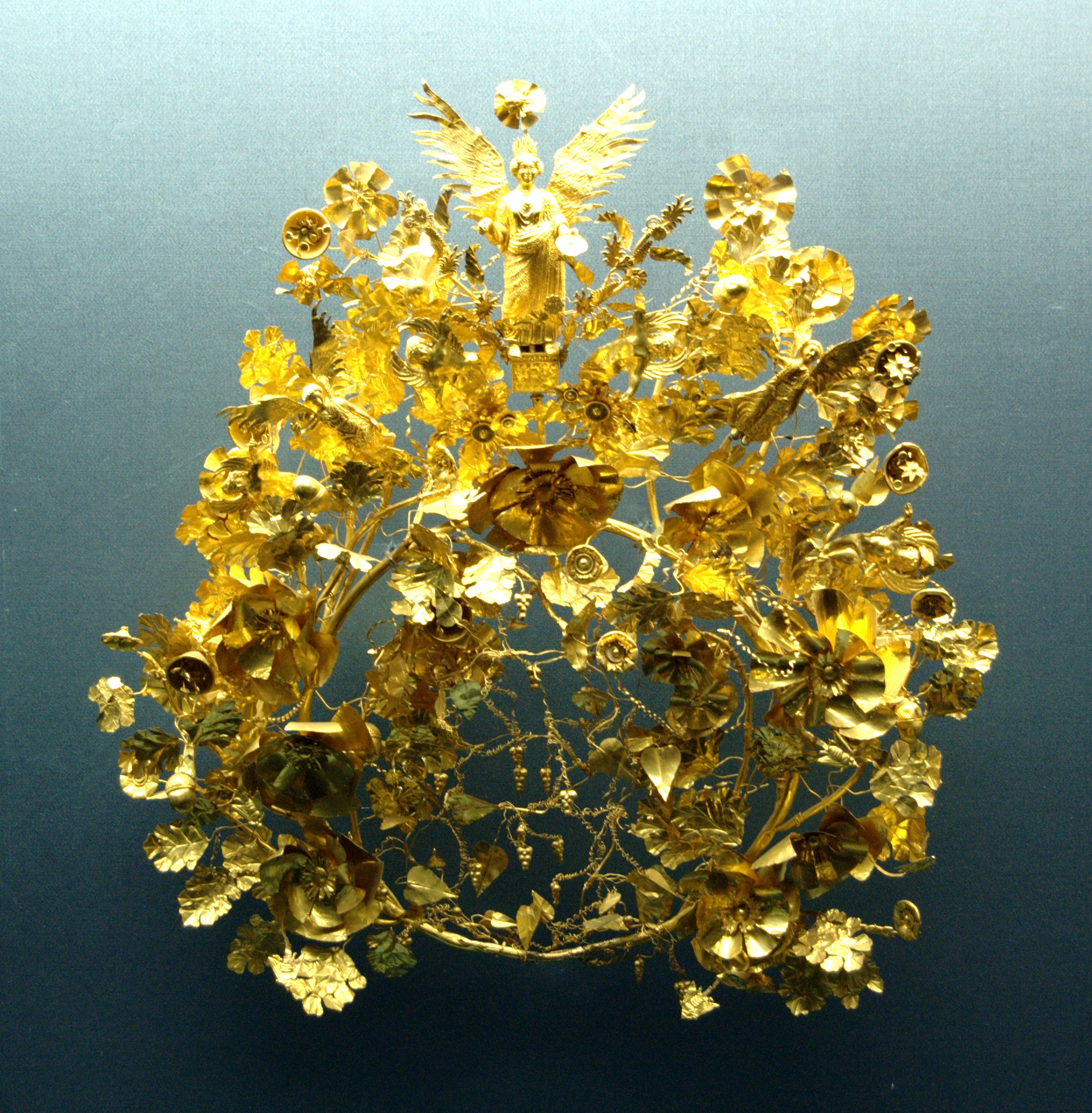
Golden garland of Armento

The State Collection of Antiquities is based on the Wittelsbach antique collections, especially King Ludwig I's collection of vases. In 1831 his agent Martin von Wagner acquired pottery from the archeological excavation in Vulci, and his agent Friedrich Thiersch purchased by auction the antiques from the estate of Lucien Bonaparte. The king also acquired antique gold jewellery from the collection of Caroline Murat, Etruscan bronzes excavated in Perugia and Greek terracotta work from South Italy.

After the king's death in 1868 his collection was united with the Wittelsbach antique collection which had previously been founded by Albert V, Duke of Bavaria. Later the museum was extended by purchase and donations. Among these private collections are the donations of Paul Arndt (1908), of James Loeb (1933), and of Hans von Schoen (1964). These comprehensive collections specialised in smaller antique objects, glassware, bronzes, terracotta pieces, jewelry, gold and silver. During World War II the museum lost especially Etruscan pottery, which was stored in the bombed Neue Pinakothek.

== Permanent exhibition ==
=== Antique pottery and Terracotta ===
The internationally renowned collection of antique pottery is outstanding, comparable only with the collections of the Louvre and the British Museum. It includes ancient Cycladic art. The Mycenaean pottery is represented, as well as pottery from the geometric, the archaic, the classical and the Hellenistic periods in Greece.

The museum exhibits artworks of the most famous Greek potters and painters like the Amasis Painter, Exekias, Archikles, Glaukytes, the Penthesilea Painter, the Andokides Painter, Oltos, Kleophon, Phintias, Euphronios, Euthymides, Epiktetos, the Pan Painter, the Berlin Painter, Hieron, Makron, Douris, the Brygos Painter, the Acheloos Painter and Lydos.

The collection contains numerous masterpieces such as the Belly Amphora by the Andokides Painter (between 520 and 510 BC) and the Dionysus cup by Exekias (circa 530 BC).

One of the masterpieces of Etruscan art is a head vessel depicting the Etruscan demon Charun (400-350 BC).

The Standing Woman is a notable statuette of terracotta (from Boeotia at the end of the 5th century BC). The Beauty is one of the best preserved ancient terracotta figures in the world. It was made in the early 3rd century BC and was found in the vicinity of Athens.

=== Jewellery, precious metal, bronzes and glass ===
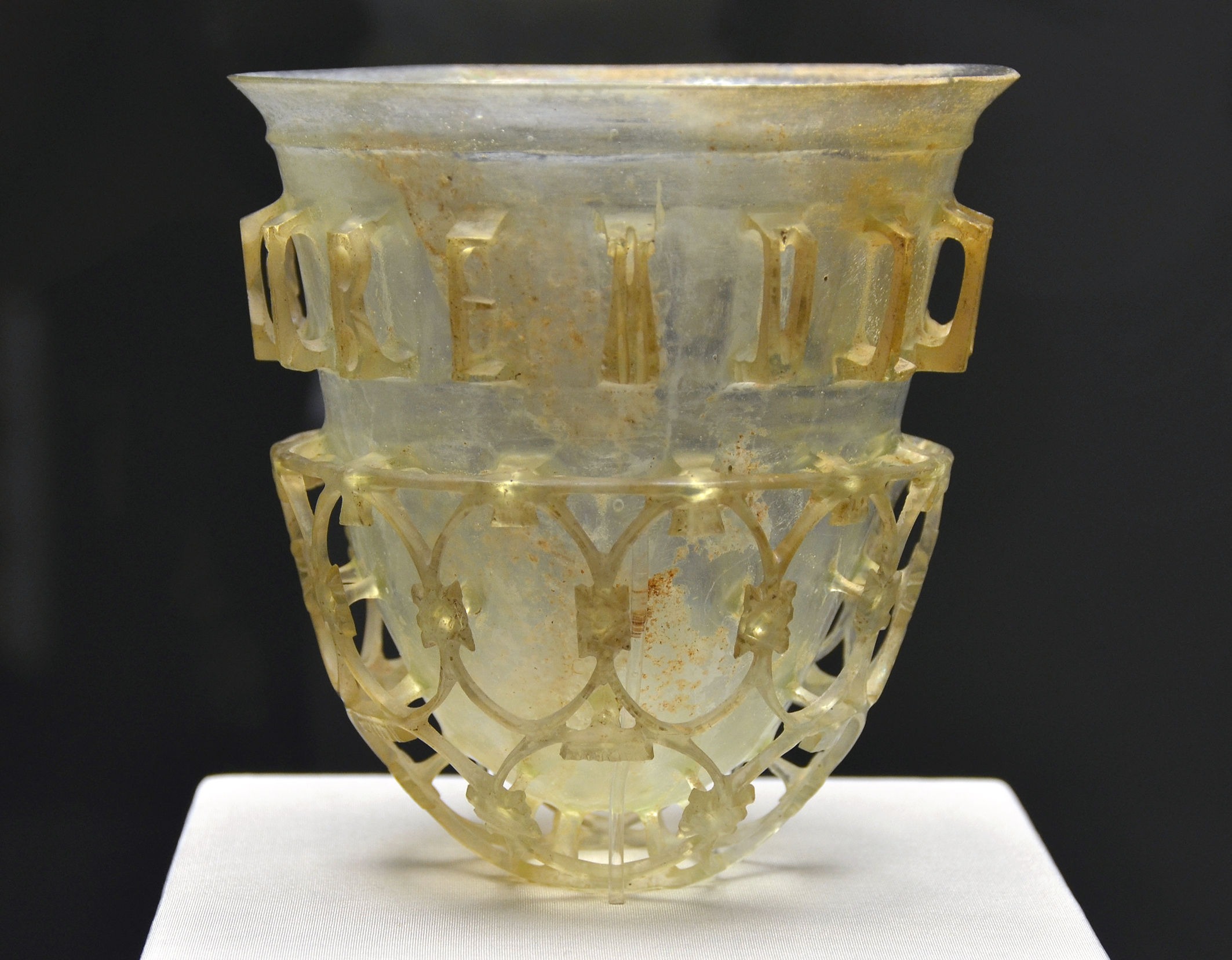
Roman cage cup from Cologne (circa 400 AD)

An outstanding example of antique jewelry is the gold Funerary Garland from Armento (4th century BC). A Golden Diadem from the Black Sea, an elaborately decorated headdress from the Crimean Peninsula, was produced in around 150 BC.

A famous Roman Goblet from Cologne made of reticella (or network) glass (4th century AD) still displays its Latin inscription BIBE MULTIS ANNIS (Drink thou for many years!). It was a present from the city of Cologne in return for King Ludwig's support for the completion of Cologne Cathedral.

The silver drinking bowl from the 5th century BC and a bowl of rare transparent soda-lime glass (500–450 BC) represent Achaemenid Persia. The Corinthian helmet from the tomb of Dendas comes from a Greek workshop in southern Italy, 500-490 BC. The Goddess of Beauty and Love is a masterpiece of Hellenistic bronze art and dates back to around 100 BC.

=== Portraits and gems ===
An antique mummy portrait which originates from around 140 AD depicts a young upper-class man of imperial Egypt. It is one of the most beautiful and best-quality antique mummy portraits that exist.

The collections also include a comprehensive collection of about 800 engraved gems donated by Helmut Hansmann (1924–1996).
