= Andokides (potter) =

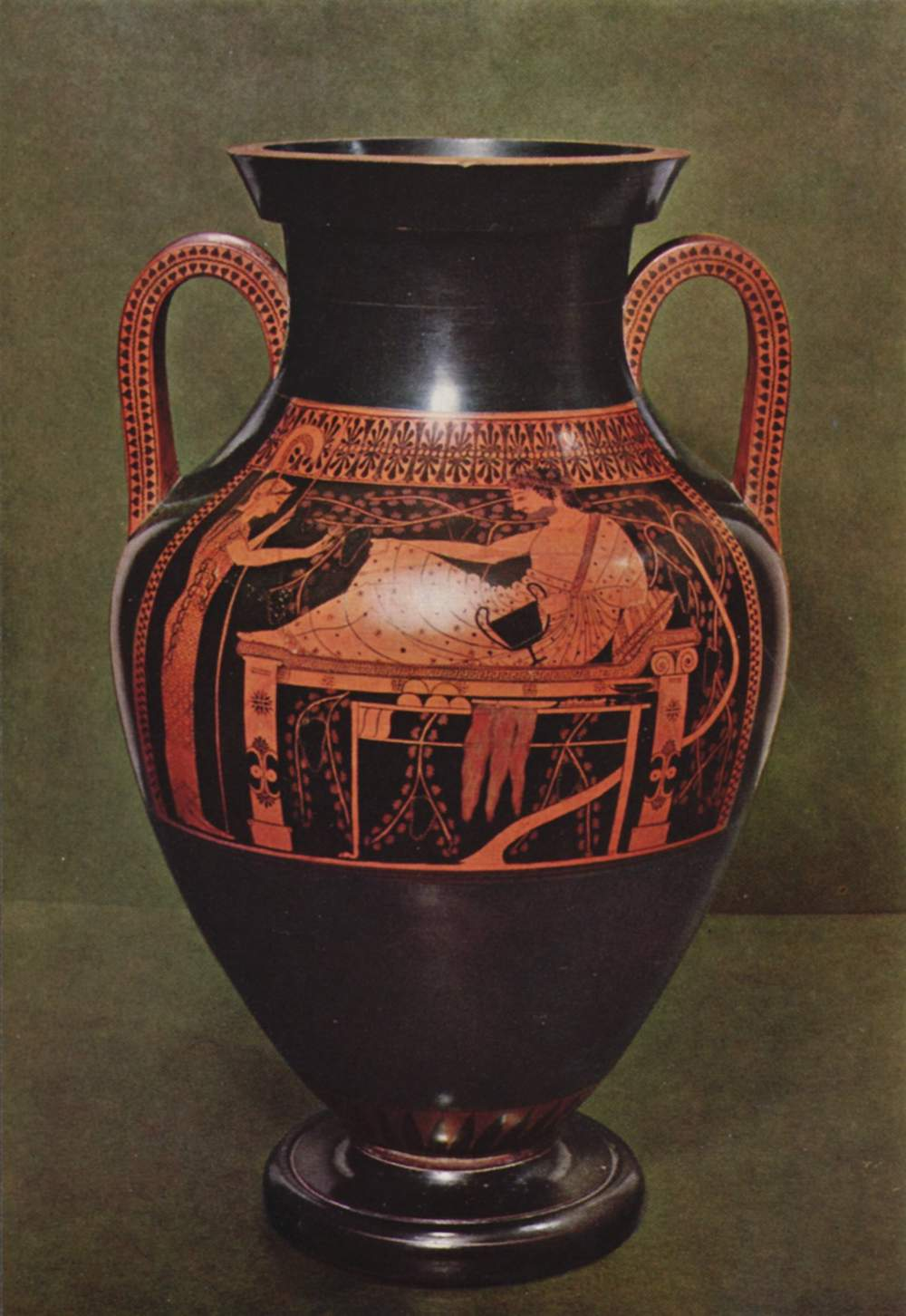
Side A (red-figure) of an Attic bilingual amphora, 520–510 BC, painted by Andokides.

Andokides (/ˌændoʊˈkaɪdiːz/; Greek: Ἀνδοκίδης) was a famous potter of Ancient Greece. The painter of his pots was an anonymous artist, the Andokides painter, who is recognized as the creator of the red-figure style, beginning around 530 BC. His work is compared with Exekias, who was said to have created the most detailed and best examples of black-figure pottery. Exekias is said to be the teacher of Andokides. Although the work of Andokides and his painter is considered inferior to that of Exekias, the invention of red figure was an important innovation.

The most renowned work of Andokides is the amphora depicting the god Dionysus and two of his maenads.
