= Dinos of the Gorgon Painter =

Ancient Athenian vase (c. 580 BC)

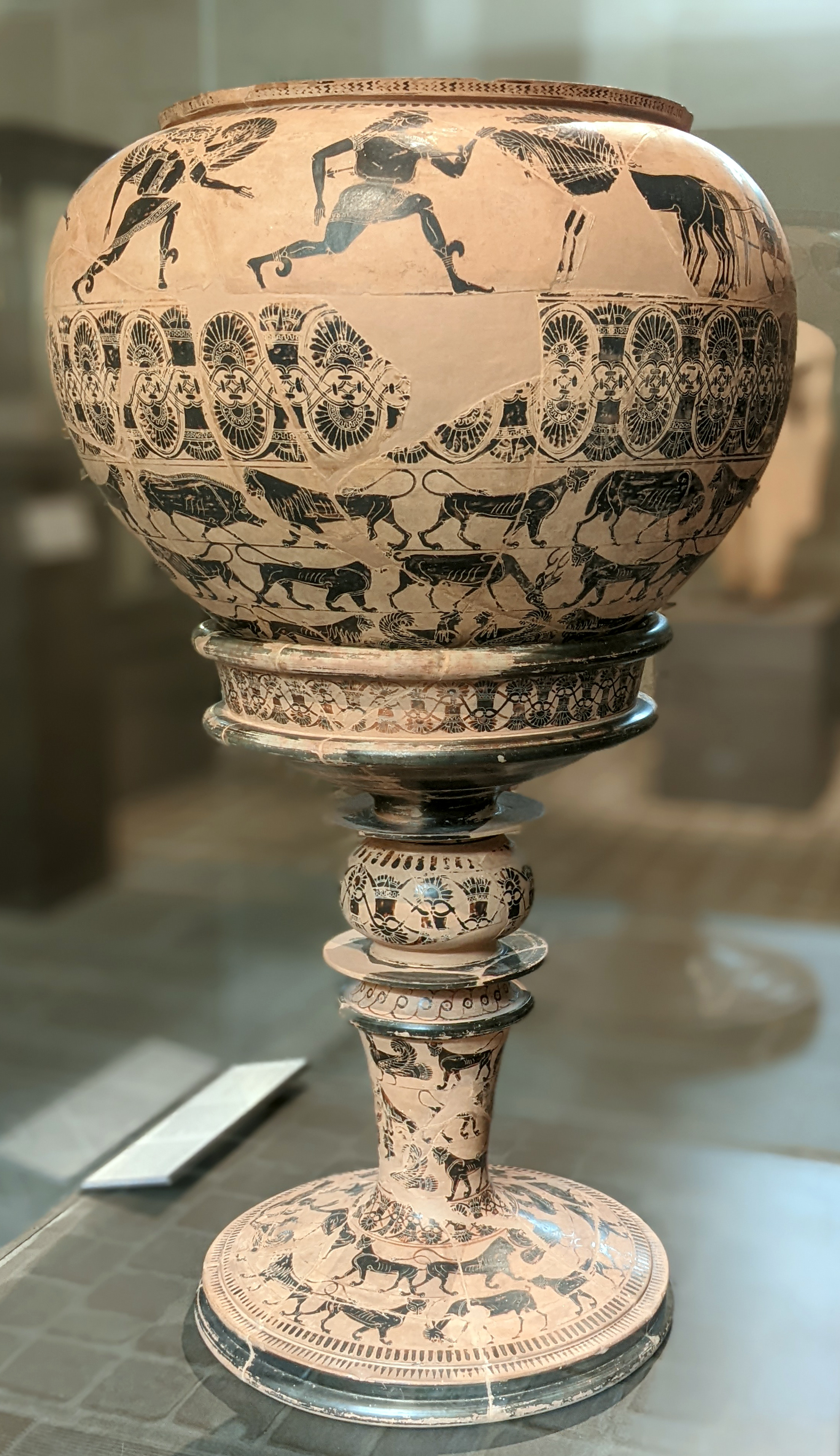
- The dinos and its stand, Campana Collection, Louvre (E 874)
- Artist: Gorgon Painter
- Year: c. 580 BC
- Catalogue: Inv. E 874
- Type: ceramic
- Dimensions: 93 cm (37 in)
- Location: Louvre; Paris
- Accession: 1861

The Dinos of the Gorgon Painter (French: Dinos du Peintre de la Gorgone) is an important example of ancient Greek pottery, produced at Athens around 580 BC. It entered the Louvre's collection in 1861, with the purchase of Giampietro Campana's collection (Inv. E 874).

This masterpiece, which is decorated with Gorgons, is the source of the name the anonymous painter who decorated it and is therefore known as the Gorgon Painter.

== Origin ==
The dinos, a banqueting vessel of large dimensions in which water was mixed into the wine, consisted of two parts: the bowl and the stand for it to rest on. The whole ensemble only rarely survives, but is the inspiration for examples in bronze which are encountered more often. While there is no doubt that this example was made in an Athenian workshop, the location of its discovery remains uncertain, though the fact that it was in Campana's collection suggests that it was acquired in clandestine excavations in Etruria. It is very unlikely that it was discovered in Greece.

== Painted decoration ==
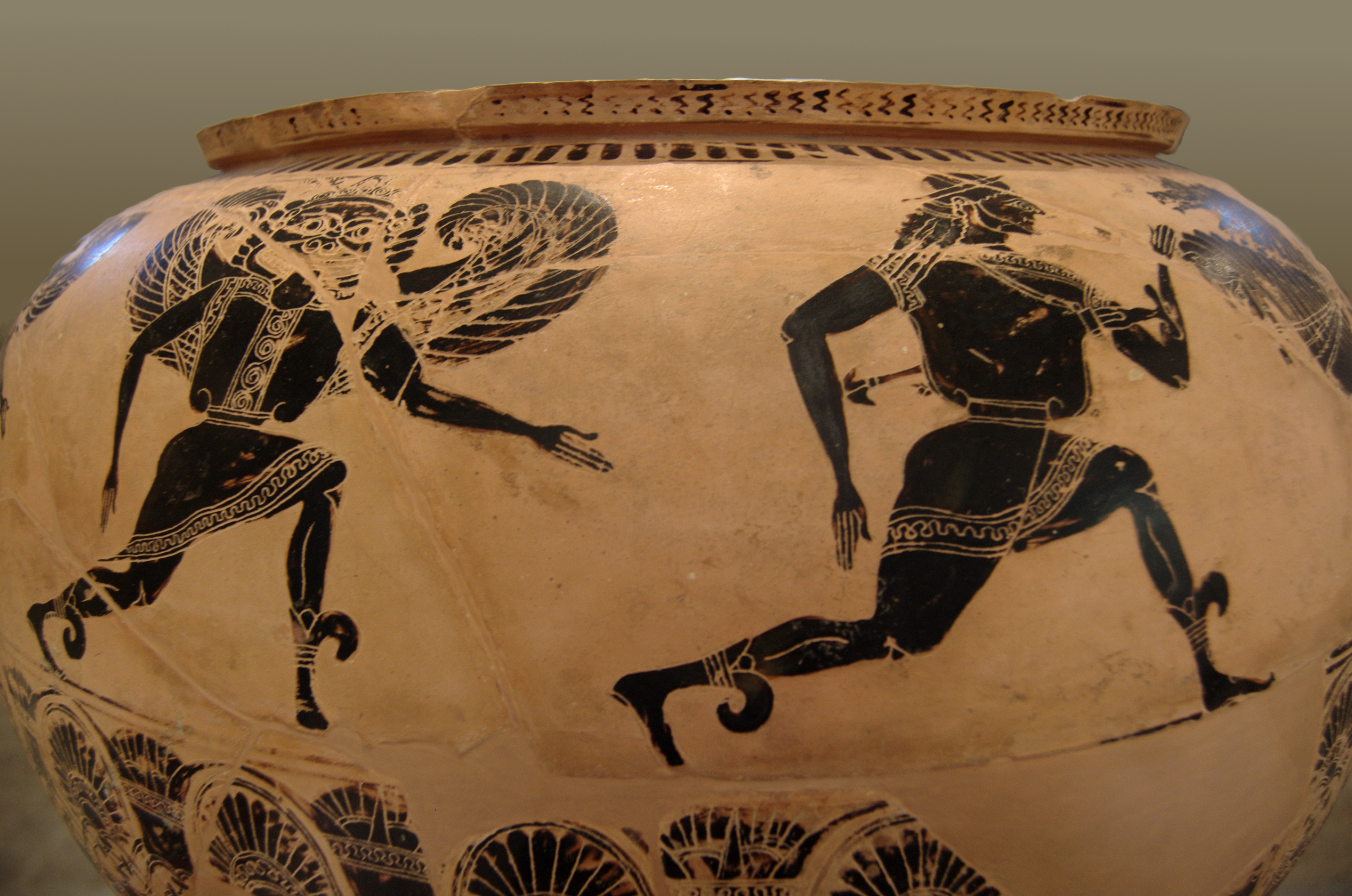
Detail: upper register, Perseus pursued by the Gorgon

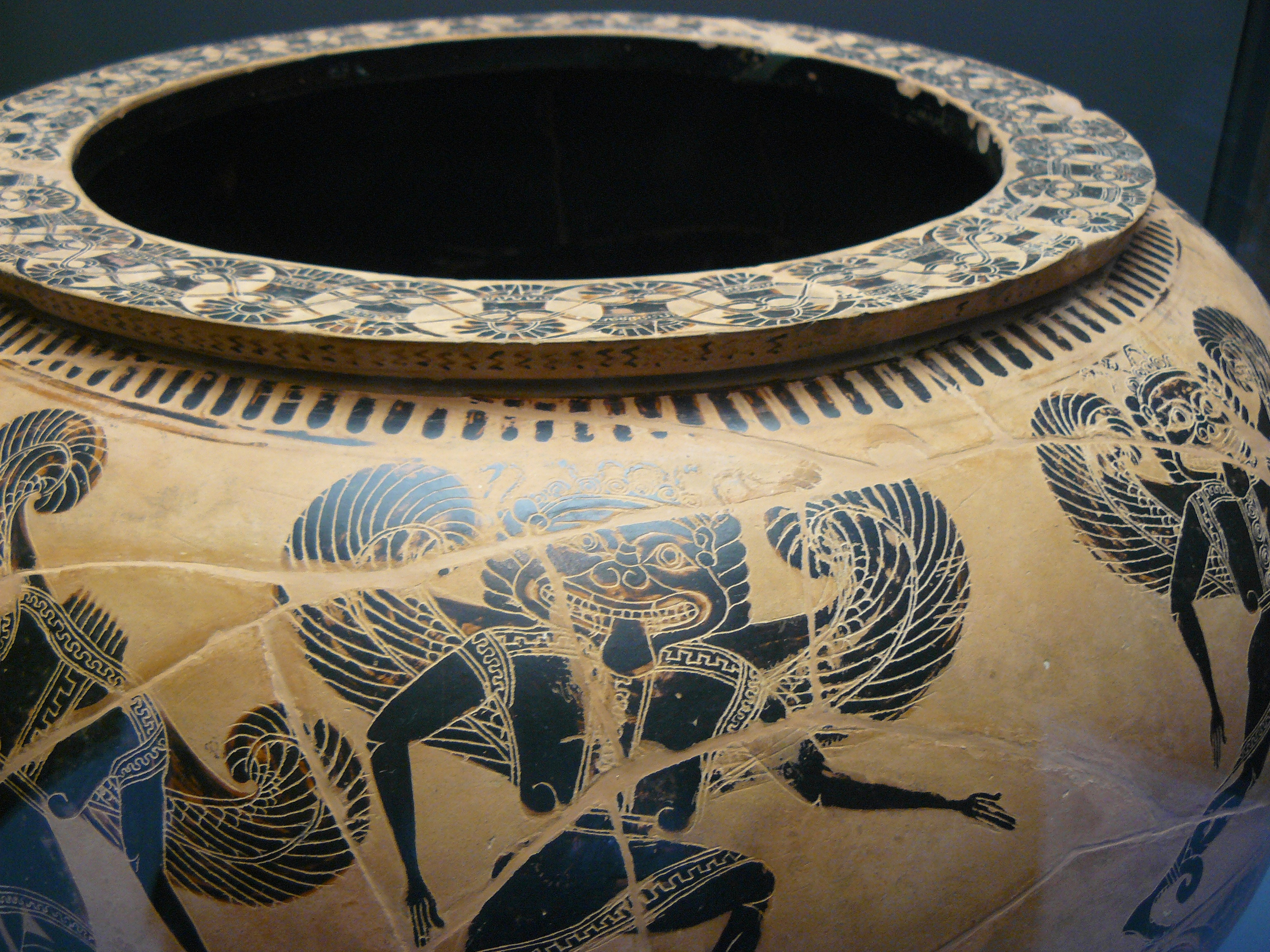
Detail: upper register, a winged Gorgon

The ceramic ensemble is decorated in the black-figure style, with ochre highlights and incisions outlining the images. The greater part of the decoration is made up of a palmette frieze with intertwined animals in the Corinthian tradition. The well-shaped stand is covered in friezes showing many different animals, like lions, cows, deer, along with fantastic creatures like sirens and sphinxes.

The vase itself is decorated with three registers, one on top of the other. The lowest register begins with a spiral on the rounded bottom of the vase and develops into four rows of animals, while the central register is a band of interlaced palmettes. The uppermost register, the most interesting, is the earliest known example in archaic Greek pottery of an entirely figurative and narrative frieze. It depicts a scene from Greek mythology: Perseus fleeing the Gorgons after he killed their sister, Medusa. The other two figures in the scene are Hermes, who can be identified by his petasos hat, and a woman who is presumably Athena. On the other side, there is a battle scene between several hoplites in chariots.

The artist who decorated the vase, whose name is not known, was a student of the Nessos Painter, the most ancient representative of the Attic black figure tradition. According to Martine Denoyelles, he also got the Gorgon theme from the Nessos Painter, but "with this entirely narrative frieze, stripped of all decorative elements, the Gorgon painter announced the blooming of Attic production, which increasingly disengaged itself from Corinthian influence in the second quarter of the sixth century BC.

== Other ancient dinoi ==
The British Museum possesses two remarkable dinoi of the painter and potter Sophilos, who was the first Attic potter to sign his works. On the stands of these two dinoi, c. 580 BC, the marriage of Peleus and Thetis is depicted in black-figure style. These examples show the same Corinthian influence which is found on the works of the Gorgon Painter in his decoration of the vases with various kinds of animals. However, the stands are much larger and the vases are proportionately much smaller.
