= Kerch style =

375–330/20 BC Greek pottery style

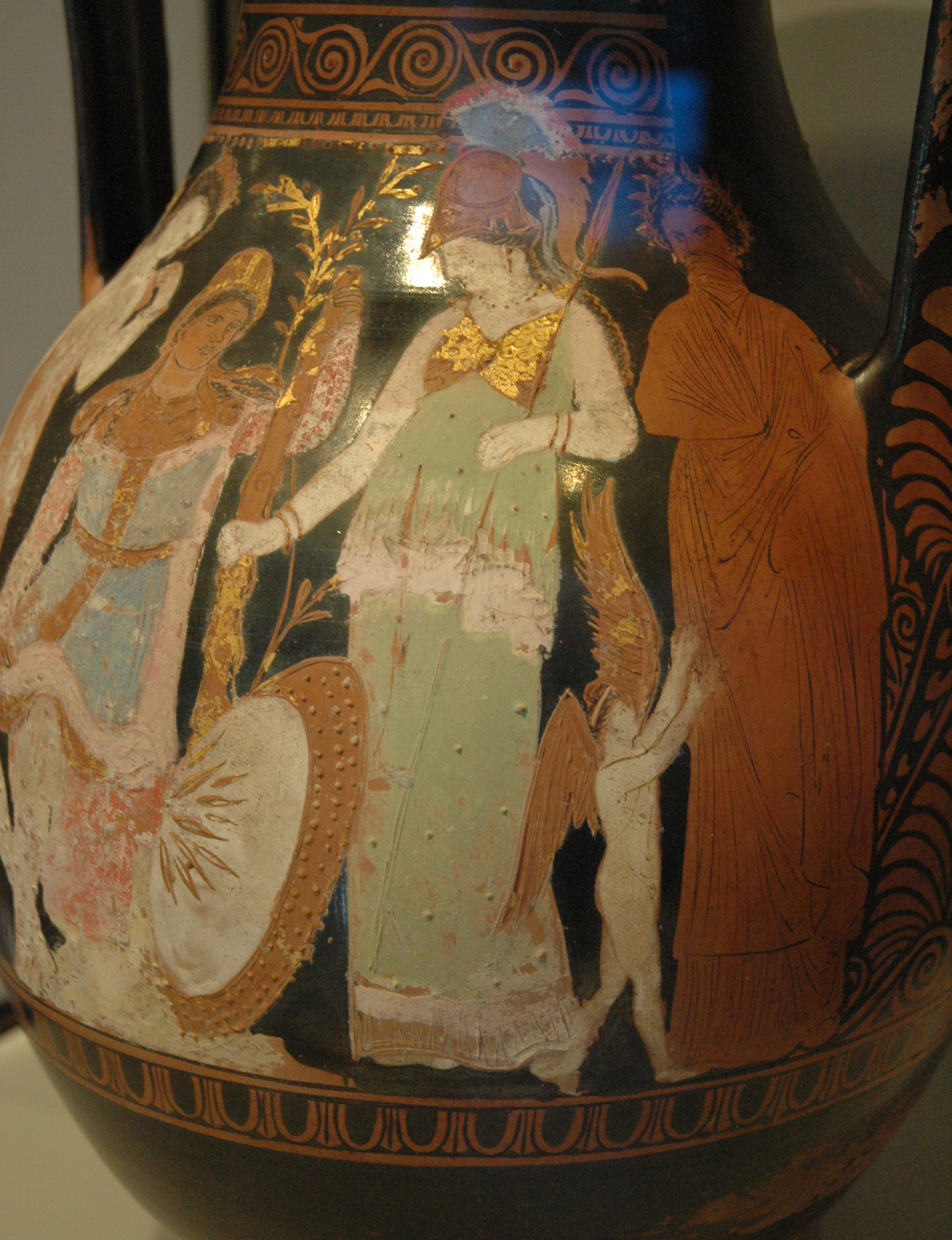
Judgement of Paris on a pelike, Painter of the Wedding Procession, circa 360 BC. Malibu, Getty Museum.

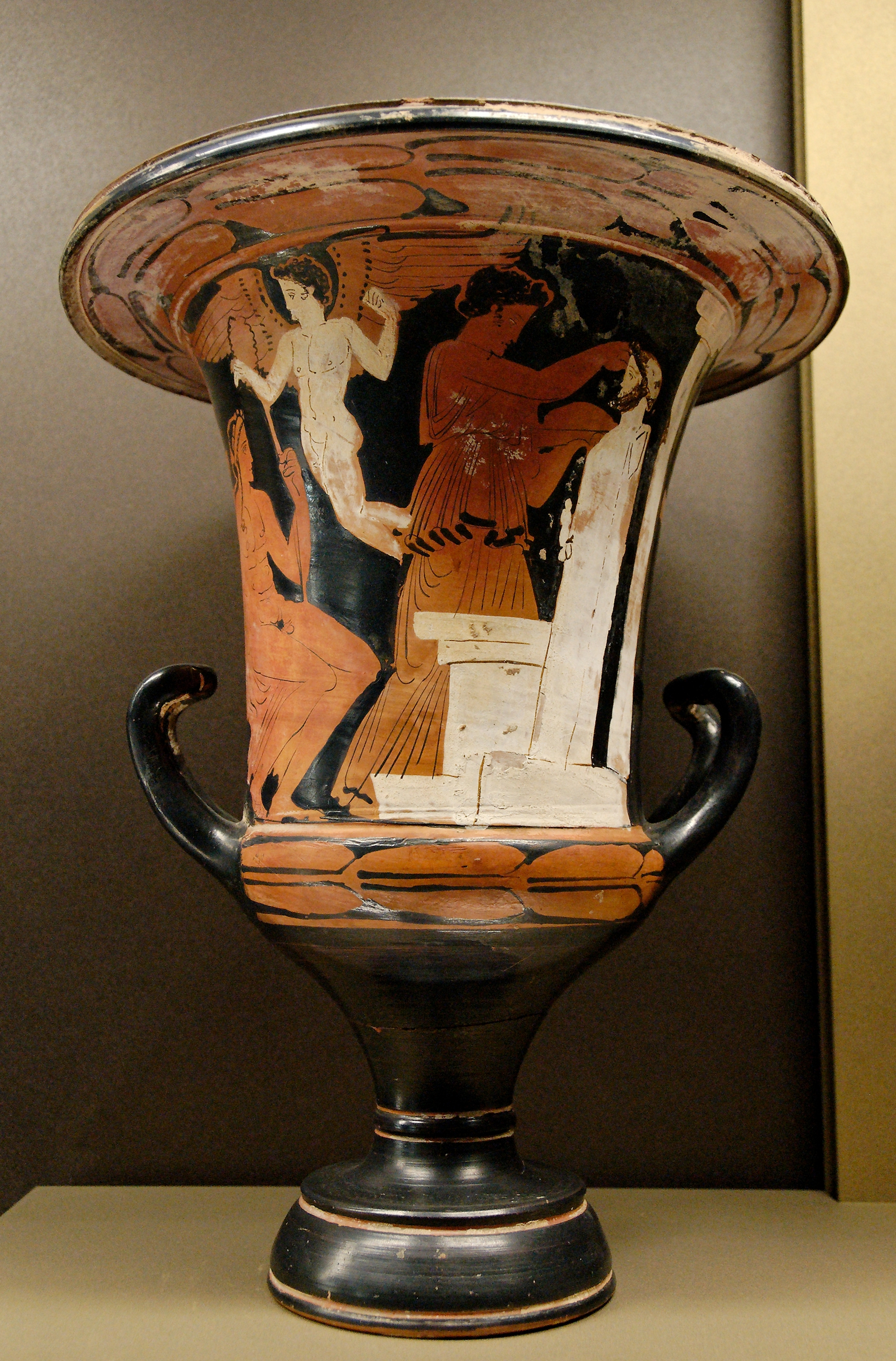
A krater by the Painter of Athens 1375, circa 375/50 BC. Paris, Louvre

The Kerch style /ˈkɜːrtʃ/, also referred to as Kerch vases, is an archaeological term describing vases from the final phase of Attic red-figure pottery production. Their exact chronology remains problematic, but they are generally assumed to have been produced roughly between 375 and 330/20 BC. The style is characterized by slender mannered figures and a polychromatism given to it by the use of white paint and gilding.

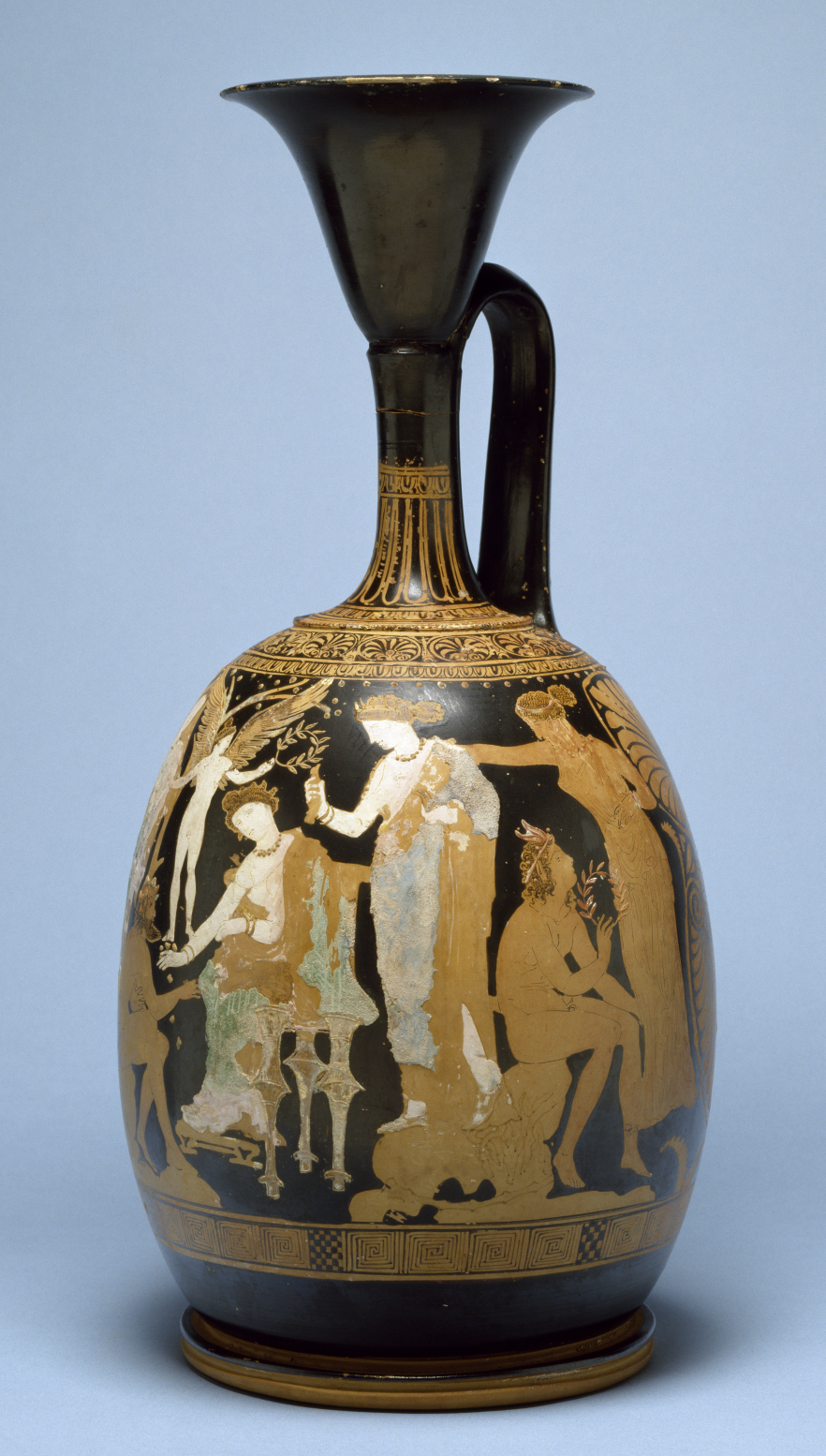
Apollonia Painter - Late Classical Red-Figure "Kerch"-Style lekythos, c. 350 BC, height: 35.5 cm (14 in), diameter: 16.7 cm (6.6 in)

The vases are thus named because a large quantity of them were found at Kerch (ancient Pantikapaion) on the Black Sea coast of Crimea. The majority of these are now in the Hermitage Museum, St. Petersburg. It is not possible to set formal criteria which separate them stylistically from the contemporary plain style of late classical vase painting around painters like the Jena Painter or the Meleager Painter. The end of the Kerch style coincides with the end of red-figure painting as a whole. The identification of individual painters is often difficult.

At the time of their production, Kerch style vases were exported to all of the Mediterranean region, but unlike earlier phases, the Black Sea area was the main market for this late phase of Attic pottery export. Most of the previously current vase shapes were still painted, but kraters, lekanes (see Typology of Greek Vase Shapes) and pelikes were especially popular. The motifs are mostly scenes from the life of women (often exaggeratedly idyllic), dionysiac themes and subjects to do with Artemis and Demeter. Fighting griffins are another common subject. The figures are often elegant and highly decorated, and in some cases painters have emphasized certain stylistic qualities at the expense of naturalism. Details and ornamentation played an important role, the best works resemble examples from the fifth century BC. White, yellow and red were often used as additional colours. The casual painting of the backs of vases is another typical feature.

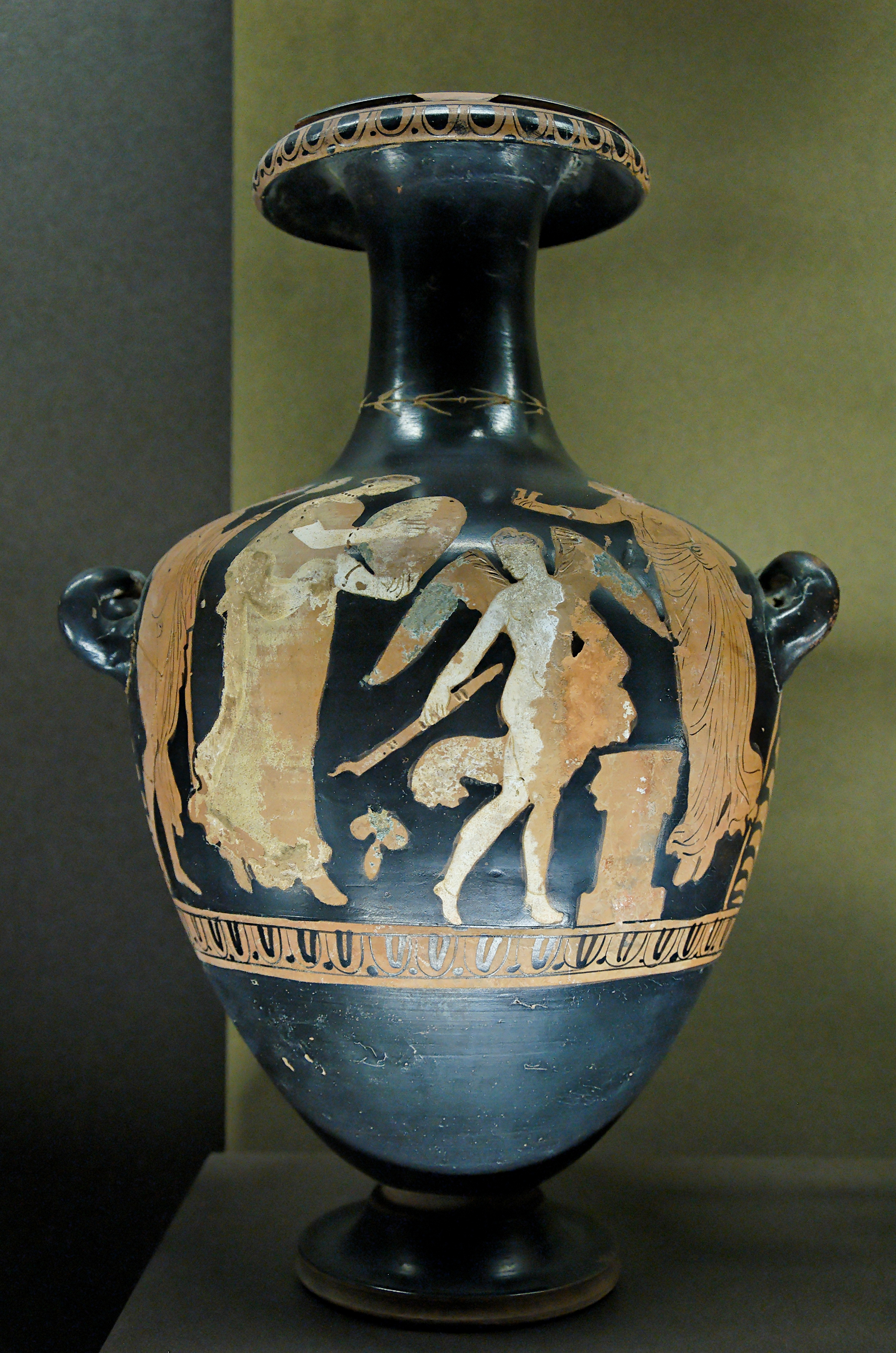
Dionysos (here unseen), maenads and Eros, hydria by the Louvre CA 928 Group, ca. 375 BC, Louvre.

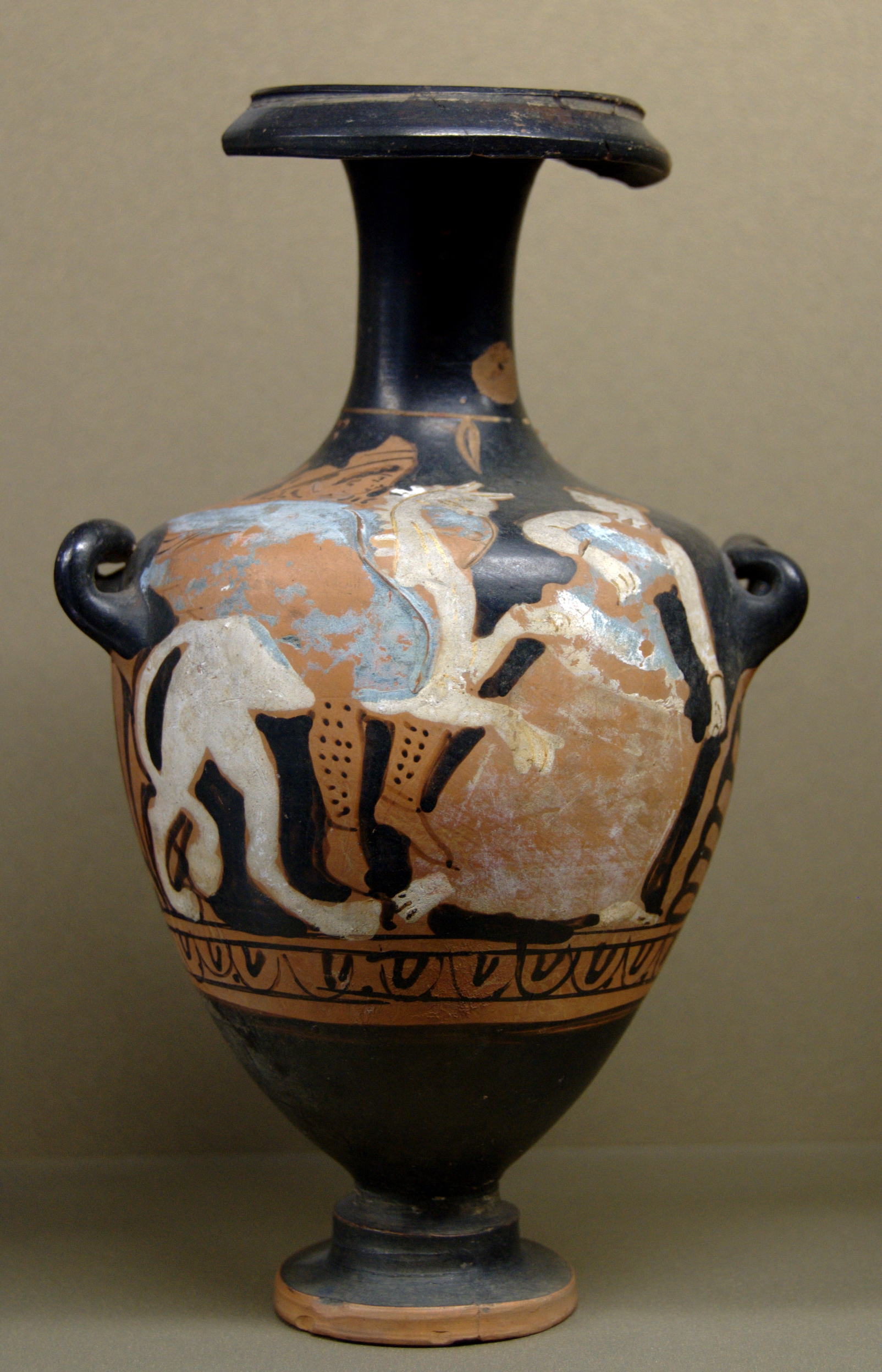
Hydria by an unknown painter, a woman and Arimaspos riding a gryphon, circa 370/50 BC. Paris, Louvre.

The Marsyas Painter, the Eleusinian Painter and the Painter of Athens 12592 mark a short and final flourish in the quality of Attic vase painting. Shortly afterwards, the activities of the YZ Group painters produced a multitude of vases of inferior quality in a number of workshops. Their end is also that of the Attic red-figure tradition. Recent research has thrown new light on this long-neglected field. The vases were first studied systematically by Karl Schefold. The most important scholar of Attic vase painting, John D. Beazley, only developed an interest in them late in his career; he did not agree with all of Schefold's views. In recent years, the analysis of fourth-century BC Panathenaic amphorae from Eretria has provided new results. Additionally, it has been demonstrated that Kerch style vases were also produced outside Attica, for example in Chalkidiki. Generally, the South Italian red-figure vase production of the time was superior to the Attic Kerch Style. The South Italian production also continued somewhat longer.

Representatives of the style include:

- Amazon Painter
- Apollonia Group
- Painter of Athens 1375
- Erotostasia Painter
- F.B. Group
- Filottrano Painter
- Group G
- Helena Painter
- Herakles Painter
- L.C.-Group
- Group of London E 230
- Otchet Group
- Pasithea Painter
- Pompe Painter
- Pourtales Painter
- Toya-Painter
- Painter of the Wedding Procession

== Bibliography ==
- John D. Beazley: Attic red-figure vase-painters. Oxford 1963.
- John Boardman: Rotfigurige Vasen aus Athen. Die klassische Zeit, von Zabern, Mainz 1991 (Kulturgeschichte der Antiken Welt, Vol 48), especially p. 198-203 ISBN 3-8053-1262-8.
- Stella Drougou: Kertscher Vasen, in DNP 6 (1999), col. 447f.
