= Dinos =

Ancient Greek mixing bowl or cauldron

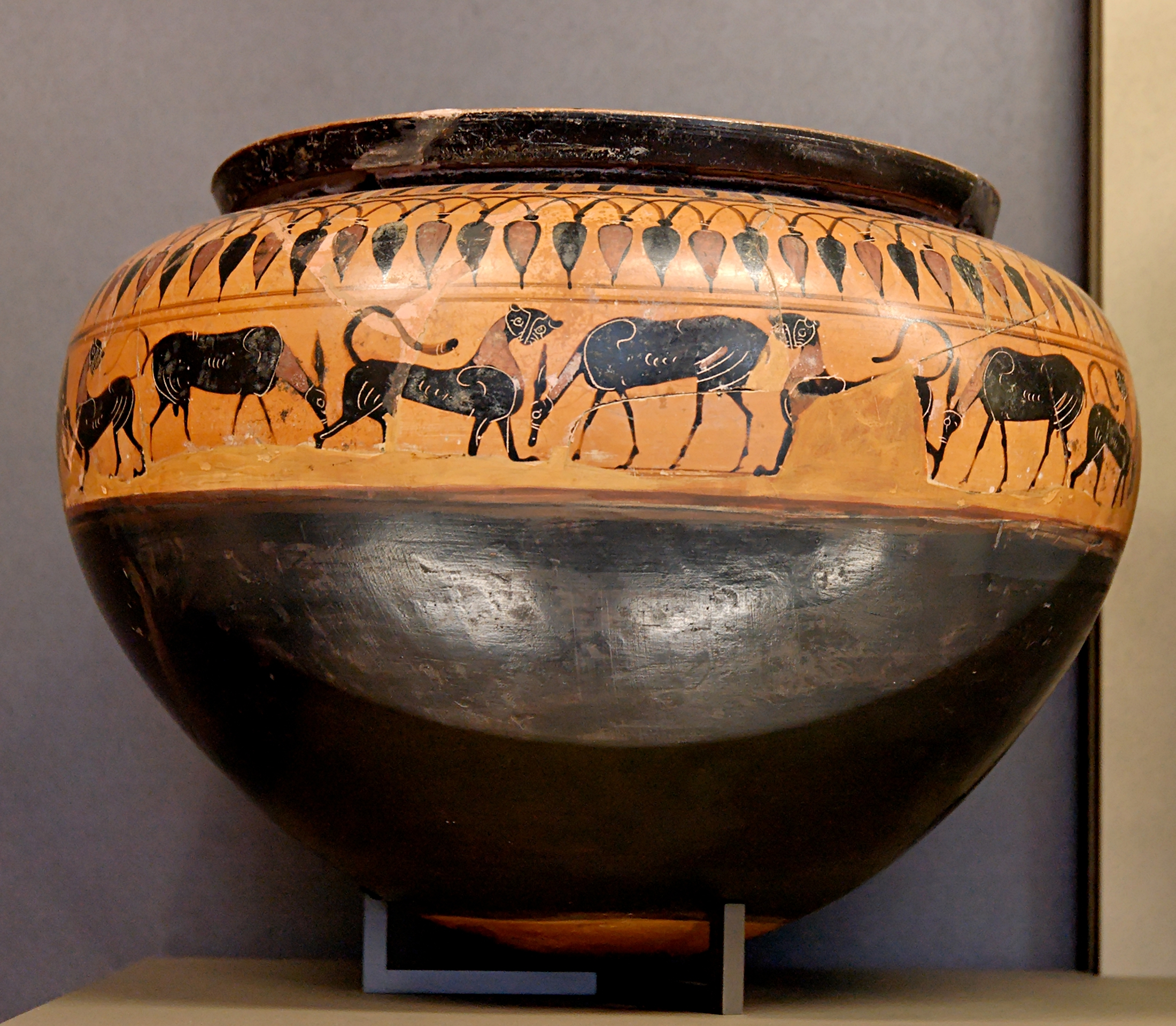
Attic dinos, c. 540 BCE, Louvre

In the typology of ancient Greek pottery, the dinos (plural dinoi, known in ancient times as a lebes) is a mixing bowl or cauldron. Dinos means 'drinking cup', but in modern typology is used for the same shape as a lebes, that is, a bowl with a spherical body, often accompanied by a wheel-turned stand. It has no handles and no feet. Literary references to such vessels are known from the Iliad, and examples have been found from between the seventh and fifth centuries BCE. Ancient artists who painted dinoi include the Dinos Painter, the Gorgon Painter, the Berlin Painter, Exekias and Sophilos.

== History ==
A dinos was a large, deep bowl, with a round bottom and a wide mouth. Dinoi were used both for cooking and for mixing wine with water. The term is modern; in ancient Greece, the word dinos was used for a drinking-cup, while the term lebes was used for the rounded bowl.

Dinoi were often made with wheel-turned stands, and could be made either in metal or in terracotta: it is likely that the metal examples were designed for cooking, while the ceramic ones were more likely to be used (similarly to kraters) for mixing wine at symposia. Dinoi are known from the seventh to the fifth centuries BCE: the oldest known Athenian black-figure example is the name vase of the Gorgon Painter, from around 580 BCE. Literary references to them are found in the Iliad and the works of Aeschylus and Aristophanes.

The Dinos Painter, active in Athens during the second half of the fifth century BCE, takes his name from the type of vase characteristic of his work. A dinos painted and signed by Sophilos, made around 580–570 BCE, depicts the wedding of Peleus and Thetis and includes the earliest known depiction of the Muses. Sophilos may have dedicated another of his dinoi, now in fragments, to the gods on the Acropolis of Athens. His dinoi are the earliest known works of ancient Greek pottery to include encircling friezes of humanoid figures.

Exekias also made and signed a black-figure dinos, now in the British Museum; another dinos is known to have been the work of the Berlin Painter. The dinos was the main product, slightly ahead of plates, of a school of potters active in Aeolis, which flourished in the first quarter of the sixth century BCE. These artists included the London Painter, and exported their works to Naucratis in Egypt and to Greek colonies on the Black Sea.

== Bibliography ==
- Bundrick, Sheramy D. (2005). Music and Image in Classical Athens. Cambridge University Press. ISBN 978-0-521-84806-0.
- Cohen, Beth (2006). The Colors of Clay: Special Techniques in Athenian Vases. Los Angeles: J. Paul Getty Museum. ISBN 978-0-89236-942-3.
- Cook, Robert M. (1997). Greek Painted Pottery (3rd ed.). Abingdon: Routledge. ISBN 0-415-13859-0.
- Mannack, Thomas (2018). "Greek Decorated Pottery I: Athenian Vase-Painting". In Plantzos, Dimitris; Smith, Tyler Jo (eds.). A Companion to Greek Art. Oxford: Blackwell. pp. 39–61. ISBN 978-1-119-26681-5.
- Mertens, Joan R. (2014). "Chariots in Black-Figure Attic Vase Painting: Antecedents and Ramifications". In Oakley, John H. (ed.). Athenian Potters and Painters. Vol. 3. Oxford: Oxbow Books. pp. 134–145. ISBN 978-1-78297-663-9.
- Robertson, Martin (1992). The Art of Vase-Painting in Classical Athens. Cambridge University Press. ISBN 0-521-33881-6.
- Sparkes, Brian A. (1991). Greek Pottery: An Introduction. Manchester University Press. ISBN 0-7190-2236-3.

== See also ==
- Ancient Greek vase painting
- Pottery of ancient Greece
