= Gorgon Painter =

Ancient Greek vase painter

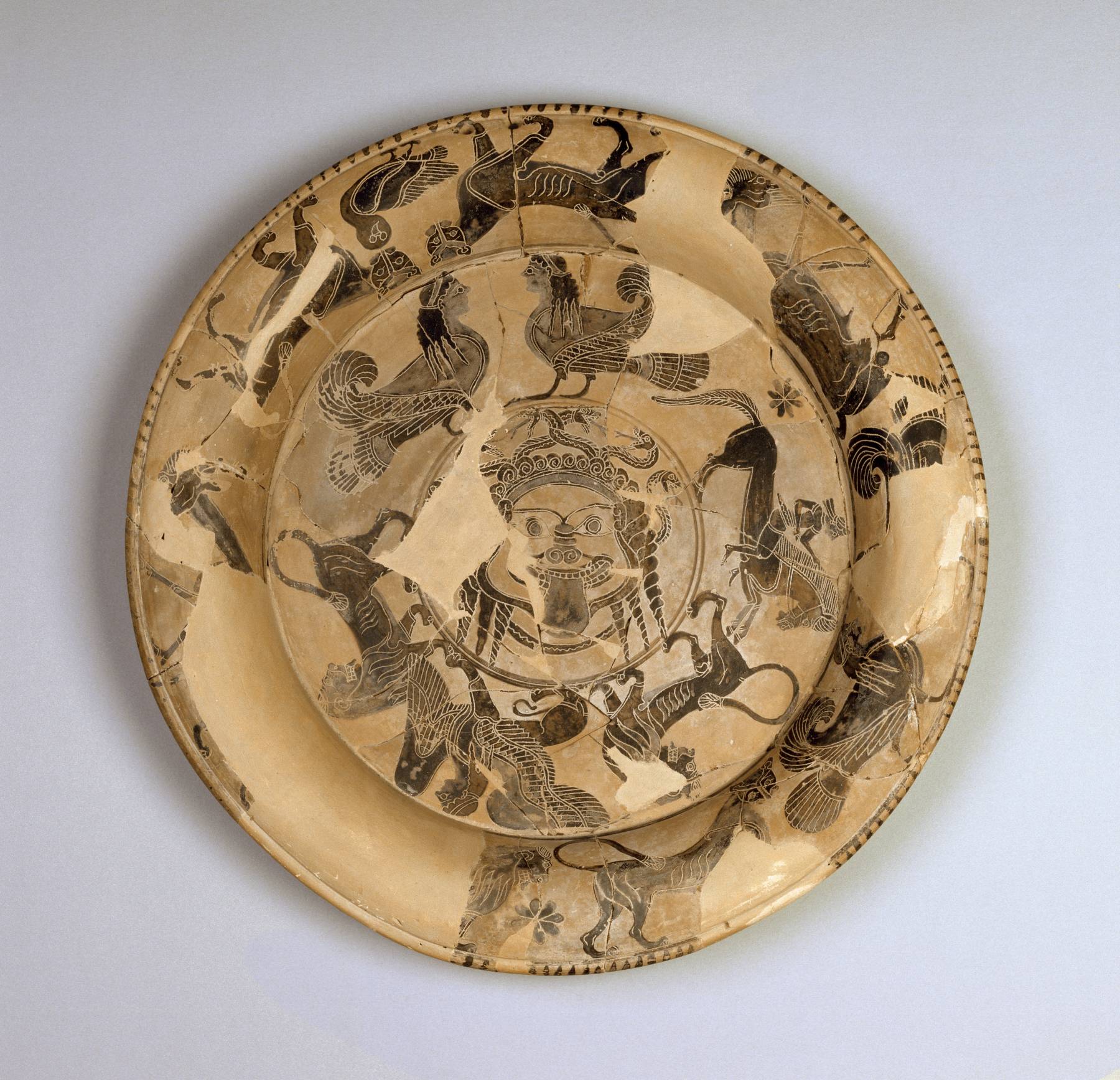
- Black-figure plate attributed to the Gorgon Painter, ca. 600 BC
- Born: Unknown. Named from the theme of his name vase.
- Died: Unknown
- Known for: Black-figure vase painting, pottery manufacture
- Notable work: Dinos of the Gorgon Painter
- Movement: Black-figure painting

The Gorgon Painter was one of the early Attic black-figure vase painters. He was active between 600 and 580 BC. His name vase, Dinos of the Gorgon Painter, is currently on display in the Louvre and depicts Perseus fleeing the Gorgons.

The Gorgon Painter is considered as a very productive successor of the Nessos Painter. Additionally, in accordance with other Geometric style artists, he arranged his subjects in symmetric patterns. Characteristic of his paintings are flat representations of humans or gods and animals painted in sections around the pottery. Rather than filling blank spaces with geometric patterns, the Gorgon Painter uses the Animal style; depicting real and fantastical animals in friezes around the vases which is considered to be a Corinthian tradition.

The better recorded artist Sophilos is said to be influenced by the Gorgon Painter, continuing work in the black-figure style and zoomorphic decoration.

== Style ==
=== Corinthian ===
The Gorgon Painter is considered to use the Corinthian style, or Animal style, in his pottery. The name comes from its place of popularity, Corinth. Not to be mistaken with the Corinthian order, within Corinthian there are different subsets including what is called Animal style, which is what the Gorgon painter is partially known for; the Animal style is marked by no geometric shapes, but rather larger depictions of animals and plants. Unlike many early depictions of animals, the Animal style does not have the animals facing the same direction, rather they interact with each other and the other elements of the piece.

Historians have noted that the Gorgon Painter uses both old myths and depictions alongside newer versions, which is how they have identified him as a singular artist.

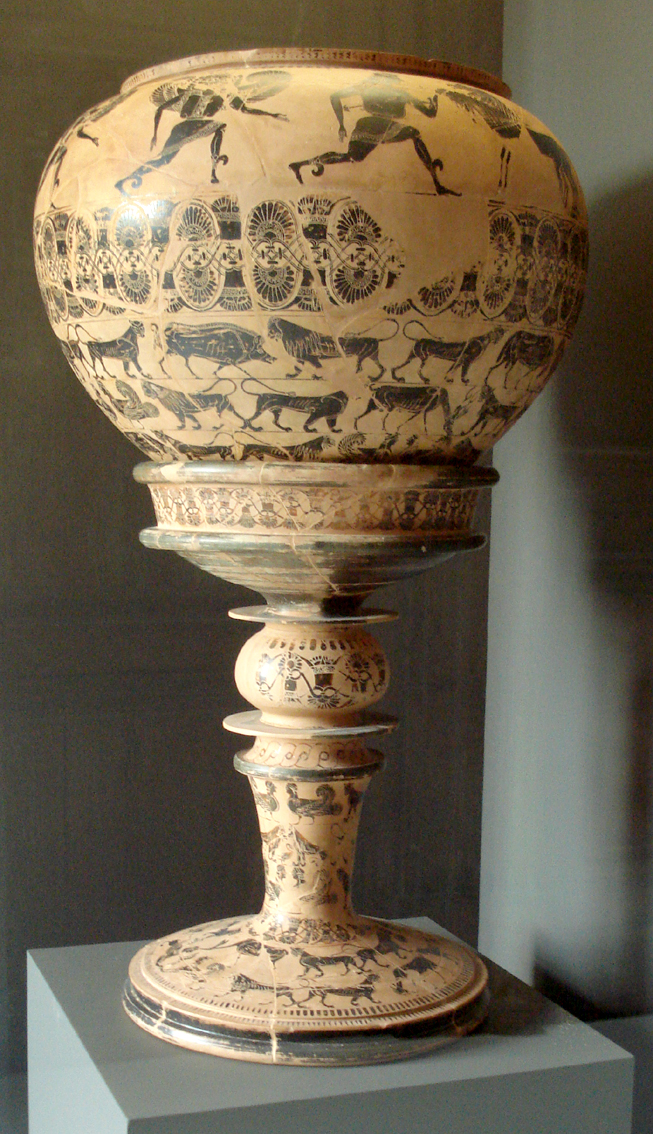
The Dinos of the Gorgon Painter, Campana Collection, Louvre (E 874)

== Themes ==
=== Name vase ===
The Gorgon Painter’s name vase depicts the Greek myth of Perseus and the Gorgons. This particular myth was quite common and is seen on many pieces of pottery by many different artists, it is considered the most popular myth represented on pottery at this time. This particular depiction shows Perseus fleeing the Gorgons after fulfilling his duty to kill Medusa. Although this dinos is the most well-known work attributed to the Gorgon Painter, it is not the only work. The Gorgon Painter often used Gorgons in his works as shown in the image of the plate, as well as animals rather than established geometric shapes.
