= Marsyas Painter =

Ancient Greek vase painter

The Marsyas Painter was an ancient Greek vase painter of the red-figure style active in Attica between 370 and 340/330 BC. The Marsyas Painter is sometimes considered the best of the Attic red-figure painters of the late 4th-century Kerch Style.

His conventional name is derived from the depiction of Marsyas on a pelike, now on display at the Hermitage Museum, St. Petersburg. So far, 23 works have been attributed to him. These include mostly larger vessels, such as lebetes gamikoi, pelikes, hydriai and lekanes. Recently, ten Panathenaic amphorae have been identified as his work, substantially improving our knowledge of his development.

He painted scenes from the life of women and other aspects of everyday life, as well as mythological themes. His figures are harmonic in spite of their monumentality; his drawing style exhibits great delicacy and skill. He is a master of spatial perspective, using foreshortening and reduction to great effect. Textiles and garments are depicted in great detail and appear voluminous. "His vases typically were elaborately decorated with gilding, raised relief, and unusual colors such as white, pink, blue, and green."

His masterpiece the St. Petersburg lebes gamikos, was found at Kerch. It depicts the epaúlia, the celebration dedicated to a newly married wife. A pelike with Peleus and Thetis by him (now at the British Museum) shows one of the best nudes known from Greek vase painting; it may be viewed online. Recently, some scholars equate him with the Eleusinian Painter.

== Bibliography ==
- John D. Beazley. Attic Red Figure Vase Painters. Oxford: Clarendon Press, 1963.
- John Boardman. Rotfigurige Vasen aus Athen. Die klassische Zeit, Philipp von Zabern, Mainz, 1991 (Kulturgeschichte der Antiken Welt, Vol 48), especially p. 199f. ISBN 3-8053-1262-8.
- Stella Drougou. Marsyas-Maler, in DNP 7 (1999), col. 956f.
