= Belly amphora by the Nessos Painter =

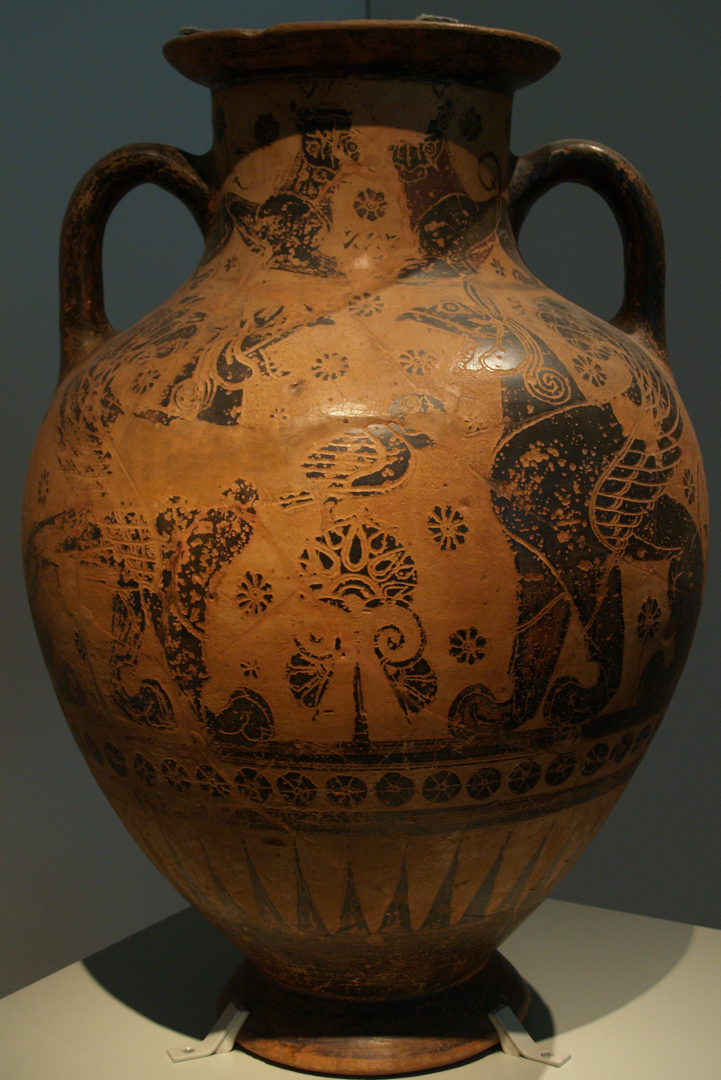
Belly amphora by the Nessos Painter.

The belly amphora by the Nessos Painter is a large tomb vase from the Attica region by Nessos Painter in a black-figure style. This abdominal amphora consists of the pictures of two griffins as the major decoration. Dated to 610-600 BCE, the vase is one of the first painted abdominal amphorae and one of the few works that are certainly attributed to Nessos Painter, the first vase painter of the Attic black-figure style. It was acquired by the Antikensammlung Berlin in 1961, and is displayed at the Altes Museum since 2001.

== Origin and display ==
The exact origin of the vase is not known except that it was found in Attica. It was acquired in 1961 by the Antikensammlung Berlin from a Viennese private collection. Initially exhibited in the collection building opposite Schloss Charlottenburg, it has been exhibited on main floor of the Altes Museum since 2001.

This vase does not occur in John D. Beazley's lists. After the acquisition of the amphora, the vessel was assigned to the Nessos Painter based on the description of the ornaments by Karl Kubler. The Nessos Painter is considered the first Attic painter personality of the black-figure style. John Boardman, Heide Mommsen, and Christa Vogelpohl assign the vase to the hand of the Nessos Painter.

== Description ==
The large vase has a conical foot, with an elongated body, long neck, and a widespread lip at the top. It measures 79 cm (31 in) in height with a maximum diameter of 54.5 cm (21.5 in) at its abdomen. The foot stand has a diameter of 26.3 cm (10.4 in), and the lip has a diameter 31 cm (12 in). The vase has two handles that have an oval cross-section. The vase was composed of several large shards. It was already broken in pieces when recovered from the ground. The surface is heavily rubbed off, and the gaps in the vase were patched out during the modern restoration. The vase is one of the oldest and first figuratively painted abdominal amphorae.

== Design ==
Only one side of the amphora was figuratively decorated, the back is completely black. The main picture shows two large griffins with particularly large paws and open mouths, with the graspings represented opposite each other. In the middle, there is a small palm tree with a perched owl. Many-leafed rosettes with core and small six-leaf specimens are distributed between the two figures as scattering ornaments. Between the two griffins, a zigzag line is painted between the head and the wings. The neck image shows two panthers attached opposite. The type of decoration speaks for an allocation of the vase as a grave vase. Gripping is very rare in Attica's black-figure vase painting.
