= YZ Group =

The YZ Group is an assumed group of ancient Greek Attic vase painters of the red-figure style.

Individual artists can only be identified with difficulty. The group was given its conventional name by John D. Beazley during his studies of Attic red-figure was painting. He named the group "YZ" because he recognised their work as the latest known figural red-figure paintings. In analogy with the alphabet, "YZ" stands for the end of red-figure painting in Athens. The group was active around 320 BC. The exact date of the end of red-figure painting remains unclear, because no detailed chronology can be developed from the vases. The fact that YZ vases are relatively numerous may indicate that their production, though short in duration, was large in output. They depict erotes, women and Nike. The tondos of bowls resemble works from the early 4th century, but are more casual and coarse in execution. Apart from bowls, askoi, pyxides and small lebetes gamikoi were also painted.

== Bibliography ==
- John D. Beazley: Attic red-figure vase-painters. Oxford 1963.
- John Boardman: Rotfigurige Vasen aus Athen. Die klassische Zeit, von Zabern, Mainz 1991 (Kulturgeschichte der Antiken Welt, Band 48), especially p. 202f. ISBN 3-8053-1262-8.
