= Kleophon Painter =

Vase painter in ancient Athens

The Kleophon Painter is the name given to an anonymous Athenian vase painter in the red-figure style who flourished in the mid-to-late 5th century BC. He is thus named because one of the works attributed to him bears an inscription in praise of a youth named "Kleophon". He appears to have been originally from the workshop of Polygnotos, and in turn to have taught the so-called Dinos Painter. Three vases suggest a collaboration with the Achilles Painter, while a number of black-figure works have also been attributed to him by some scholars.

== Background ==
The Kleophon Painter was known for his paintings of various red-figure Attic vases during the fifth century BC. The themes of his vases for the most part stick to a few specific genres, specifically, Greek mythology, domestic themes (including sacrifices and parades), and paintings of warriors. Of the vases that have been discovered, there are 104 domestic style vases, forty-three mythological vases, and twenty-four paintings about warriors. His vases can be found throughout the world. Even in the 5th century BC he shipped vases as far as Italy and Spain, according to the provenance that the vases have been found in. The majority of his vases are bigger vases, with only a few smaller ones. Most of his vases are kraters.

The Kleophon Painter had a pretty common style which makes his vases difficult to distinguish from other vases that were painted during the same time period. Many vases are classified as "in the manner of Kleophon P" or "compares to Kleophon P". One painter that he was similar to was the Dinos Painter. The Dinos Painter also had a fairly general style, which made him and Kleophon similar and hard to distinguish between. One of the ways to identify works by the Kleophon Painter is by the location of the vase combined with the attributes on the vase such as the theme, type of vase, patterns, and style of the characters on the vase, especially the eyes and chin. In the Kleophon Painter’s case, the eyes are usually a rounded off triangular shape and the chin is generally rounded off or even bulbous at times.

The Kleophon Painter was likely located in or around the city-state of Athens, as his work was mostly discovered there. Twenty-two of the Kleophon Painter’s vases are still located in Athens at either the Agora Museum or the National Archaeological Museum.

The characters he paints are almost always seen in the home. Other creations depict a warrior departing or returning home or mythologically themed works. These are harder to attribute to him because so many vase painters use mythology as a subject; however, the Kleophon Painter was fairly specific with what myths he painted, usually either Dionysus with his Maenads or Hephaestus. Dionysus is harder to determine because many kraters that were used to hold wine had paintings of Dionysus on them, and they were not always the work of the Kleophon Painter. Hephaestion is a less common subject to paint which makes those vases easier to pick out.

== Vases ==
The Kleophon Painter painted mostly large vases, especially calyx kraters. Of the 180 known vases that he painted, sixty-nine were calyx kraters. He painted twenty-seven hydriai and nineteen pelikes. He painted twelve stamnoi and eleven amphoras. There are also seven loutrophoroi, five lekythoi, one pyxis and one cup discovered that have been determined to be the work of the Kleophon Painter.

== Themes ==
=== Domestic or ritual ===
The most common theme painted on the Kleophon Painter’s vases was a domestic or ritual theme. There are 104 known vases by the Kleophon Painter that have domestic or ritual themes to them. He painted the domestic theme on a variety of different styles of vases. He liked to paint ceremonies such as weddings and the Komos. The Komos was a ceremony in ancient Greece where most of the people involved would drink heavily and parade into the center of town. It is not known what the purpose of this ceremony was but historians theorize that it was either to celebrate a wedding or some kind of worship for the gods. If the painting was not a sacrifice, Komos or parade then it was probably just a regular domestic theme from ancient Greece.

A great example of a domestic style vase is an Attic red-figure hydria discovered in Delos, Greece, and currently located in the Mykonos Archaeological Museum. The date range for this work is between 450 and 400 BC. It has few if any intricacies about it. It is a plain painting of two women facing each other. On the very top lip there is a tongue pattern that wraps all the way around the top of the hydria. There is a more intricate tongue pattern that wraps around the neck just above the shoulder of the hydria. Around the bottom there is a meander pattern interrupted with a cross pattern every fourth block. With the exception of these three patterns the hydria is very basic. It shows two women standing facing each other with a mirror suspended in between them. The woman on the left (as you look at the hydria) is holding a box with her head bowed. She is wearing a hat and does not have hands that are visible. The woman on the right has her head bowed as well but not quite as far and is not wearing a hat. Both women’s faces are strikingly similar. The eyes are triangular in shape, which is a common feature in most of the Kleophon Painter’s works. Their noses are unnaturally triangular and their chins have a smooth curve. The woman on the right has a slightly more bulbous chin than the one on the left. Both women are wearing fairly basic robes that go all the way down to their feet. The robes have a few lines and folds in them but for the most part are plain. The only two things in the background are a mirror that seems to be hanging in midair (most likely to be presumed that it is hung on a wall) and a seat with a simple pattern on it.

The Kleophon Painter’s style of painting clothing is fairly consistent throughout a large portion of his works.

Another domestic painting that is attributed to the Kleophon Painter is a calyx krater with two youths preparing to sacrifice a bull, discovered in Spina, Italy, and currently located in Ferrara in the Museo Nazionale di Spina. The Italian location indicates that the Kleophon painter shipped his vases outside of Greece. The date range is 450 to 400 BC. This is the same date range found on almost all of the Kleophon Painter’s works, which means that he did not have anyone carry on his workshop after he died. The krater itself has a leaf pattern that circles the top lip. There is a meander pattern, interrupted by a cross every fourth block, that wraps around the bottom. Side A shows two young males leading a bull to an altar, presumably to be sacrificed. Both of these young males have on robes that stop just above their feet. The eyes, again, are triangular shaped on the youths, but much more circular on the bull. Side B shows the same two boys, but no bull. It can be assumed that the goal of painting the krater this way was to show that the bull had been sacrificed. The boys are standing at the same altar that they had led the bull to on Side A.

=== Greek mythology ===
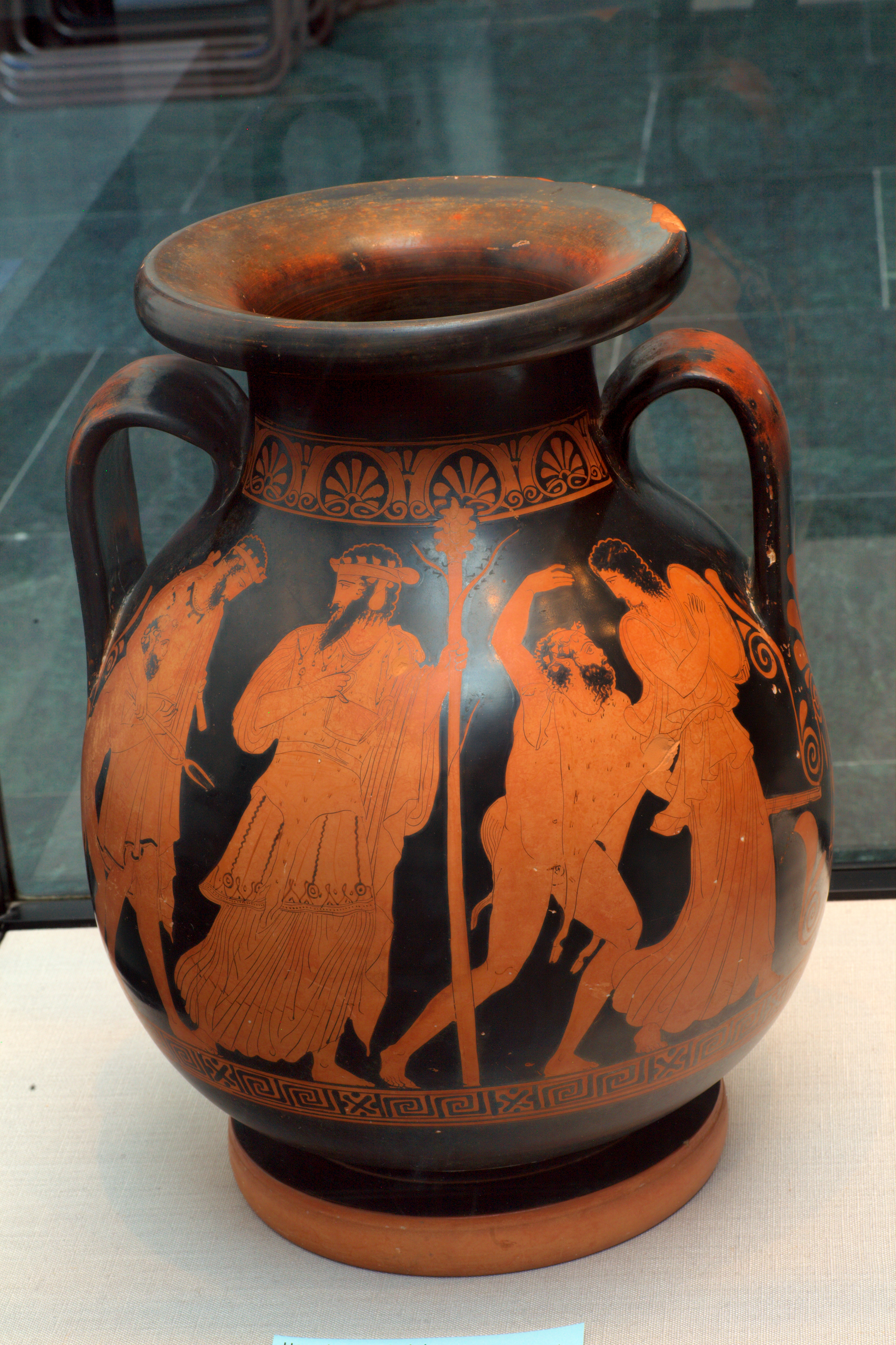
Pelike depicting Hephaestus, attributed to the Kleophon Painter

The second most common theme in the Kleophon Painter’s works is Greek mythology. He often painted the return of Hephaestus or depictions of Dionysus. Hephaestus was the god of metalworking. According to myth, he was cast out of Olympia by Zeus after he stood up against him in defense of his mother. He would end up on earth and is said to have made armor for Achilles that was so bright and obviously god-made that the Trojans fled instantly at the sight of it. Those who did not were mercilessly slain. Kleophon paints the return of Hephaestus quite a few times on pelikes, skyphoi and kraters.

Dionysus was the god of the grape harvest and wine. He is usually painted by the Kleophon Painter with his female followers called Maenads. They were known for getting extremely drunk and losing all inhibitions, often engaging in uncontrolled sexual behavior as well as hunting wild animals. Dionysus and the Maenads were usually painted on kraters by the Kleophon Painter, likely because the kraters were used for making wine.

While the themes of Dionysus and Hephaestus are common in the Kleophon Painter’s works, one of the best examples of a mythological theme is a painting of Eos and Kephalos, in the collection of the Metropolitan Museum of Art in New York City. It is an Attic red-figure vase dating from 430 to 420 BC, attributed to the Kleophon Painter by John Beazley. The painting is black from the top of the neck down to the middle of the neck with a tongue pattern interrupting the black and red in the middle of the neck. Below the tongue pattern is a three flower pattern wrapped around the neck of the lekythos. The flower pattern extends from the tongue pattern at the thinnest part of the neck down to the top of the shoulder. It has one handle (black with red on the inside) that extends the length of the neck ending at the shoulder. Wrapped around the shoulder is a red meander pattern interrupted by a saltire pattern every fourth box. Underneath the shoulder is where the main decoration is located. It is a picture of the Titaness Eos with her lover, Kephalos. Eos is, in Greek mythology, the goddess of the dawn. Kephalos was her lover, she can be seen in other vase paintings holding Kephalos, who is sometimes painted in the nude. In this painting, both figures are clothed. Eos is identified by her wings and flowing robes. Eos’ eyes are triangular and directed toward Kephalos. Kephalos’ eyes are slightly more circular but still triangular in appearance and face back toward Eos. Eos has many folds on her clothing which are rounded off at the bottom whereas Kephalos has almost no folds in his clothing.

The vase is symmetric all the way around the neck and top of the shoulder. The only discrepancy is that the handle is located right between side A and B. The vase changes from a symmetrical vase with nothing but patterns to a scene of Eos and Kephalos underneath the shoulder. On side A, Eos can be seen reaching out toward Kephalos. She is wearing long robes and has wings that are folded behind her. Side B shows Kephalos with an aggressive-looking stance facing Eos. He is wearing a hat and has shorter robes. He is wearing calf-high boots with heels that are a slightly darker red than the rest of his body.

The lekythos depicting Eos and Kephalos does an excellent job of showing the common trends in the style of painting in a majority of the Kleophon Painter’s works. The meander pattern interrupted every fourth block is a good indicator that this is a Kleophon painting. Most of his works include a meander pattern as well as a tongue pattern. The meander pattern is almost always interrupted every fourth block. The next thing to look at is the eyes on the figures in the painting. They usually come to a point furthest from the nose and may or may not be slightly rounded out. The background is very plain as it is with most of the Kleophon Painter’s vases and this vase is fairly large.

=== Warriors ===
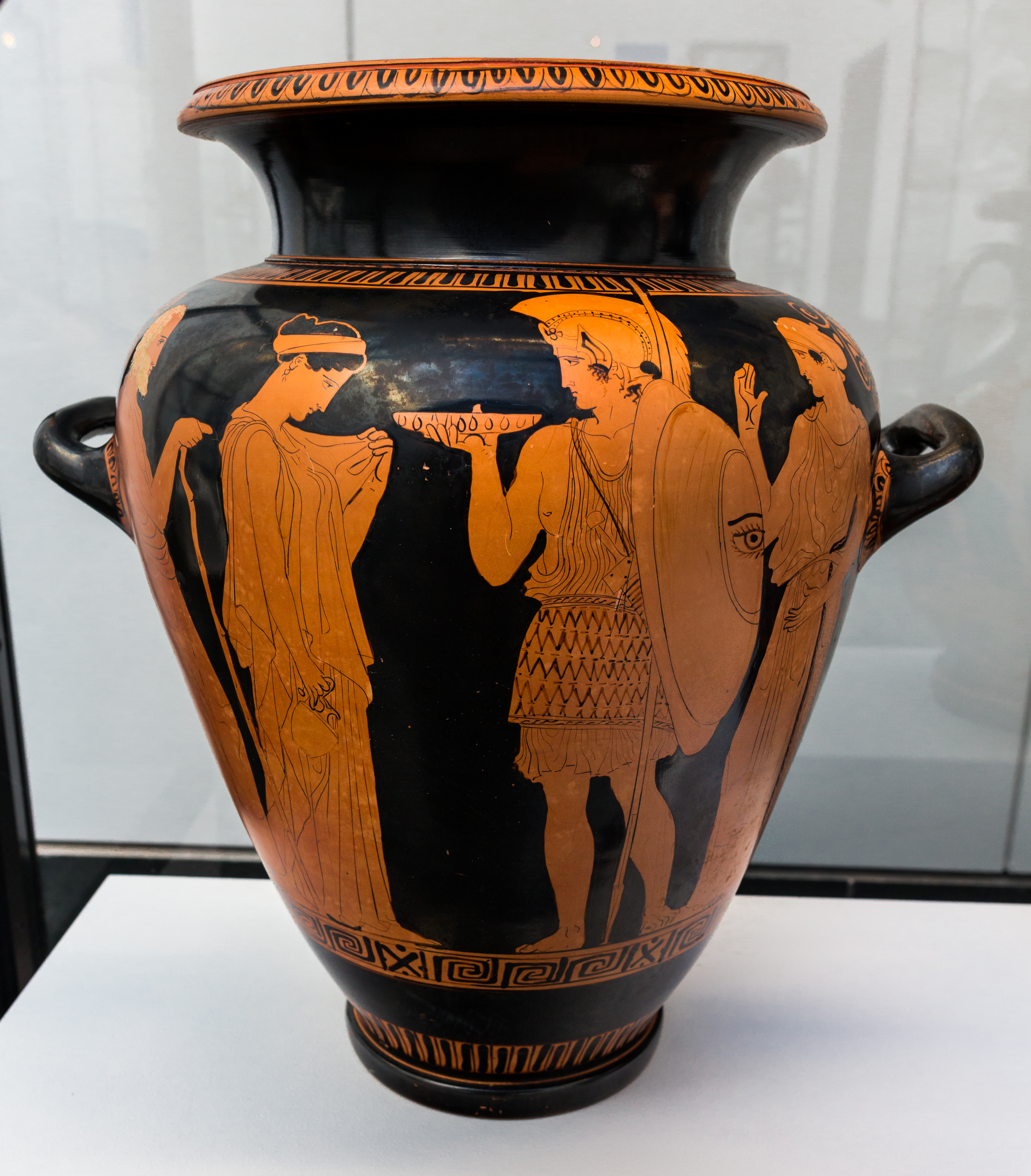
Stamnos depicting a departing warrior, attributed to the Kleophon Painter

The third and final main theme found in the Kleophon Painter’s works is that of warriors. The warriors are usually shown leaving their families or coming home, rarely are they seen in battle. It seems that the Kleophon Painter liked to make paintings that would have had an upper-class female target market. This can be seen by the location that most of the vases were discovered in as well as the themes that he is known for painting. The only time warriors are seen is when they are around the home, either departing or returning. This indicates that the women in the house would have these vases around as reminders of their loved ones.

An excellent example of a painting of a departing warrior is found on Attic red-figure vase number 215168. This is a bell krater that was discovered in South Italy. It is currently located in the Staatliche Antikensammlungen in Munich, Germany. The date range, as with almost all other Kleophon Painter vases, is 450 to 400 BC. This krater was attributed by Beazley. The krater has a leaf pattern wrapped around the top of it with lines bordering the top and bottom of the pattern. There are tongue patterns wrapped around the part of the krater where the handle meets the krater at both connecting points on both handles. The rest of both handles are painted black. At the bottom of the krater there is a meander pattern interrupted every third block with a saltire pattern. This pattern is also bordered on both the top and bottom with a solid line. The scene on side A shows the warrior flanked by two other figures; an old man who appears to be handing the warrior his helmet, and a woman who is seen holding the warrior’s shield. The old man and the woman are both wearing robes while the warrior is depicted nude. The shield has a dot in the center with thirteen prongs coming out away from the dot and coming to a point at varying lengths within the shield itself. The warrior is wearing nothing but a headband and a sheath with his sword in it. His robe is draped over his left arm which is holding his spear. Side B shows three youths all wearing robes. The eyes, again, are all triangular in shape. The youth to the far right has his right hand up as if telling the other two youths to stop or slow down. He is facing to the left (as you look at the vase) while the other two are facing back at him. All three have very similar, almost identical faces. They all have on the same style robes and are wearing a thin headband covered somewhat by their hair.

== See also ==
- Pottery of ancient Greece
