= Dinos Painter =

Classical Greece vase painter

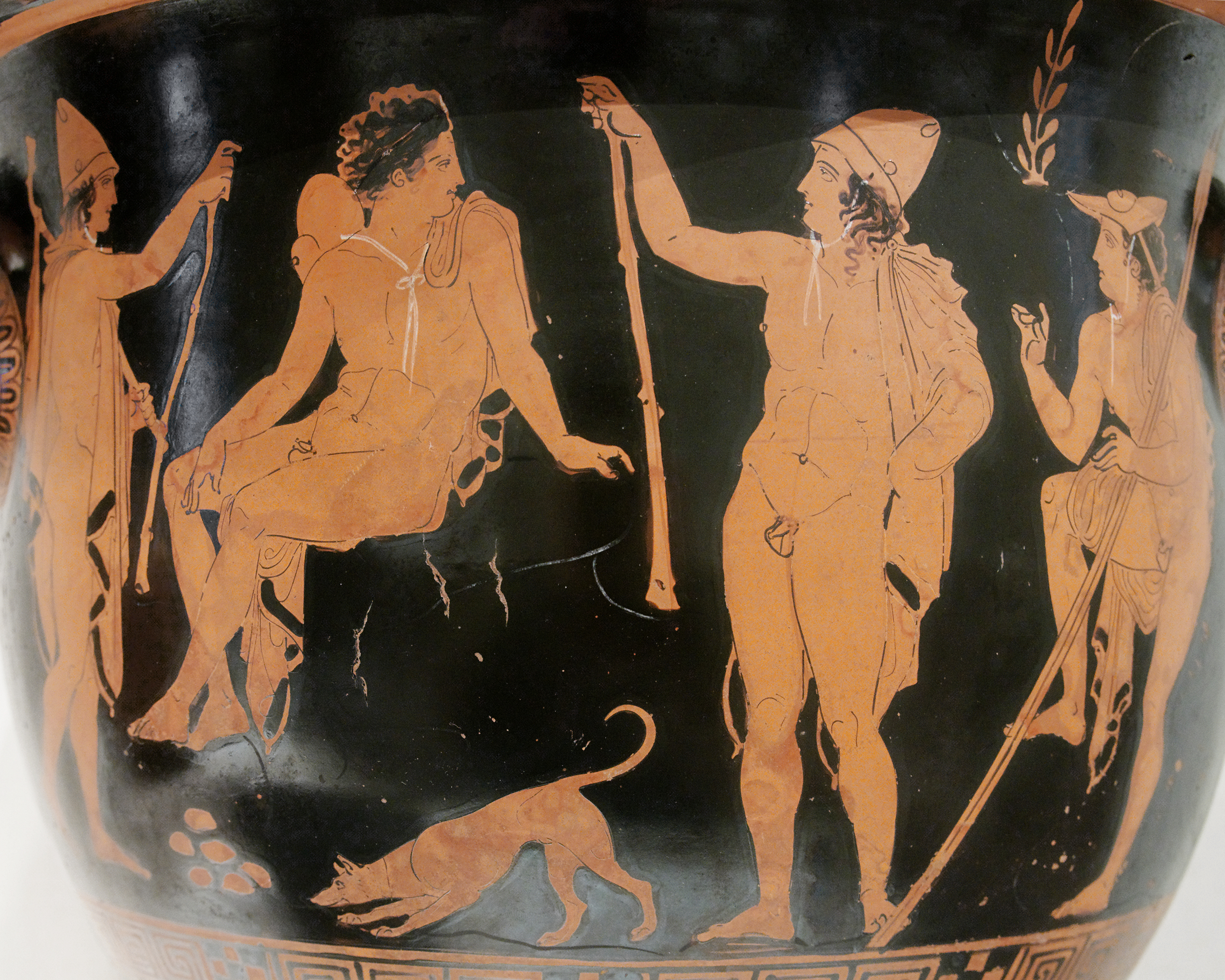
Aktaion with other mythological heroes as hunters (Tydeus, Theseus, Kastor). Side A of an Attic red-figure bell-krater. New York City, Metropolitan Museum of Art.

The Dinos Painter was an Attic red-figure vase painter who was active during the second half of the 5th century BC. The Dinos Painter stood in the tradition of the Kleophon Painter, but was less serious. One or few figures are depicted as the centre of an event; the frieze-like depiction of the course of the event seen in earlier styles is absent. His paintings initiate the "Rich Style" of the following generation; he already uses an increased amount of white to stress details. The technique of using white to depict Eros and furniture is an innovation of the Dinos Painter; a generation later it formed part of the standard repertoire.

Most of the works attributed to the Dinos Painter are on large vases. He is named after one of his chief works, a vase in Berlin depicting Dionysos reclining.

Although most of the Dinos Painter’s vases were found in Italy, Sicily, and Athens, his works were also found as far afield as Spain and Syria. Out of the eighteen vases found in Athens, three of them were found on the Acropolis. Three vases were found in Egypt and Syria. One vase was found in Samaria and one in Lebanon.

The majority of the Dinos Painter’s works include bell kraters. However, calyx kraters, amphorai, lebetes, pelikai, and one loutrophoros fragment have been found.

== Bibliography ==
- John Beazley. Attic Red Figure Vase Painters. Oxford: Clarendon Press, 1963.
- John Boardman. Rotfigurige Vasen aus Athen. Die klassische Zeit, Philipp von Zabern, Mainz, 1991 (Kulturgeschichte der Antiken Welt, Vol 48), especially p. 67 and 100, ISBN 3-8053-1262-8.
