= Sacrificial tripod =

Type of furniture

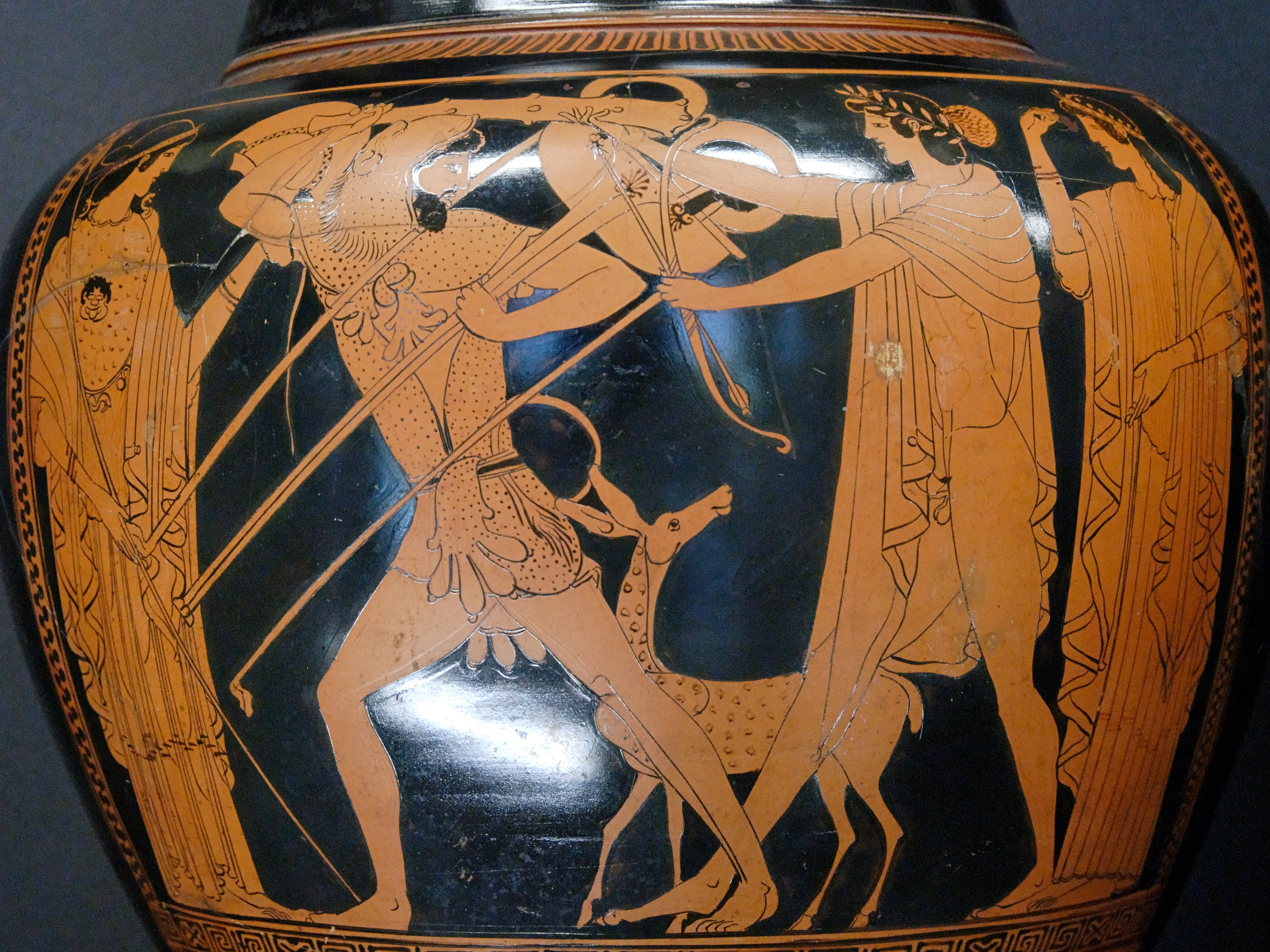
Apollo and Heracles struggle for the Delphic tripod; side A from an Attic red-figure stamnos, c. 480 BC. Louvre

A sacrificial tripod, whose name comes from the Greek meaning "three-footed", is a three-legged piece of religious furniture used in offerings and other ritual procedures. This ritual role derives from its use as a simple support for a cooking vessel placed over a fire. As a seat or stand, the tripod is the most stable furniture construction for uneven ground, hence its use is universal and ancient.

Tripods had two types and several functions. Firstly, some oracles sat on large tripods to pronounce. Far more common were the tripods and bowls in which smaller sacrifices were burnt. These are particularly associated with Apollo and the Delphic oracle in ancient Greece. These were also given to temples as votive offerings, awarded as prizes in contests associated with religious festivals, and just given as gifts between individuals.

== Ancient Greece ==
The most famous tripod of ancient Greece was the Delphic Tripod on which the Pythian priestess took her seat to deliver the oracles of the deity. The seat was formed by a circular slab on the top of the tripod, on which a branch of laurel was deposited when it was unoccupied by the priestess. In this sense, by classical times the tripod was sacred to Apollo. According to the myth, Heracles went to the oracle of Delphi in order to ask what to do in order to be expiated from the murder of Iphitos. The oracle did not want to give him an omen. The enraged hero then grabbed the tripod on which the Pythia sat in order to pronounce her oracles. Apollo tried to prevent him and this resulted in a fight between the god and the hero. Finally, Zeus had to intervene in order to end this quarrel. The mytheme of Heracles contesting with Apollo for the tripod appears in vase-paintings older than the oldest written literature. The oracle originally may have been related to the primal deity, the Earth. In the Geometric period, the tripods were fastened to the cauldrons they supported. In the Museum of Delphi there are fragments of such tripods, most distinctive of which is the one with a ring-shaped handle.

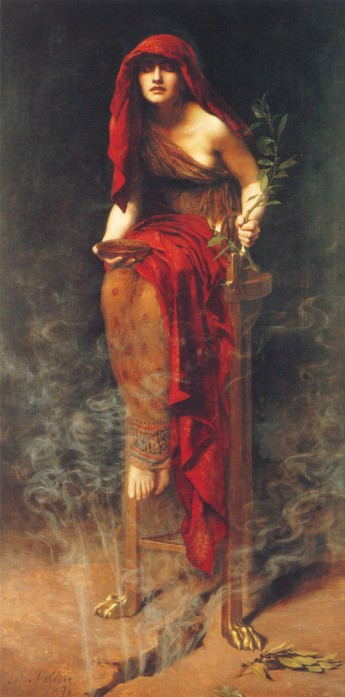
Priestess of Delphi (1891), as imagined by John Collier; the Pythia is inspired by pneuma rising from below as she sits on a tripod

Another well-known tripod in Delphi was the Plataean Tripod; it was made from a tenth part of the spoils taken from the Persian army after the Battle of Plataea. This consisted of a golden basin, supported by a bronze serpent with three heads (or three serpents intertwined), with a list of the states that had taken part in the war inscribed on the coils of the serpent. The golden bowl was carried off by the Phocians during the Third Sacred War (356–346 BC); the stand was removed by the emperor Constantine to Constantinople in 324, where in modern Istanbul it still can be seen in the hippodrome, the Atmeydanı, although in damaged condition: the heads of the serpents have disappeared, however one is now on display at the nearby Istanbul Archaeology Museums. The inscription, however, has been restored almost entirely. Such tripods usually had three ears (rings which served as handles) and frequently had a central upright as support in addition to the three legs.

Tripods were frequently mentioned by Homer as prizes in athletic games and as complimentary gifts; in later times, highly decorated and bearing inscriptions, they served the same purpose. They appear also to be precious gifts for the guests, as in the case of the Phaeakes, who offered a cauldron and tripod to Odysseus. "Our guest has already packed up the clothes, wrought gold, and other valuables which you have brought for his acceptance; let us now, therefore, present him further, each one of us, with a large tripod and a cauldron. We will recoup ourselves by the levy of a general rate; for private individuals cannot be expected to bear the burden of such a handsome present." Odyssey, 13.10–15 [tr. S. Butler]

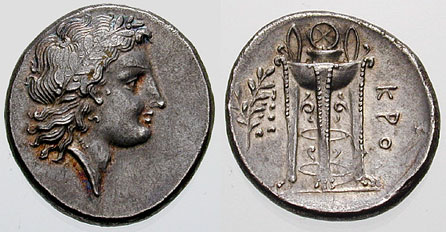
An ancient Greek coin c. 330–300 BC. Laureate head of Apollo (left) and ornate tripod (right)

They also were used as dedicatory offerings to the deities, and in the dramatic contests at the Dionysia the victorious choregus (a wealthy citizen who bore the expense of equipping and training the chorus) received a crown and a tripod. He would either dedicate the tripod to some deity or set it upon the top of a marble structure erected in the form of a small circular temple in a street in Athens, called the street of tripods, from the large number of memorials of this kind. One of these, the Choragic Monument of Lysicrates, erected by him to commemorate his victory in a dramatic contest in 335 BC, still stands. The form of the victory tripod, now missing from the top of the Lysicrates monument, has been rendered variously by scholars since the 18th century.

Martin L. West writes that the Pythia at Delphi shows many traits of shamanistic practices, likely inherited or influenced from Central Asian practices. He cites her sitting in a cauldron on a tripod, while making her prophecies, her being in an ecstatic trance state, similar to shamans, and her utterings, unintelligible.

According to Herodotus (The Histories, I.144), the victory tripods were not to be taken from the temple sanctuary precinct, but left there as dedications. Excavations at early sanctuaries, especially Olympia, yielded many hundreds of tripod-bowl vessels, mostly in bronze, deposited as votives. These had a shallow bowl with two handles raised high on three legs; in later versions the stand and bowl were different pieces. During the Orientalising period, the tripods were frequently decorated with figural protomes, in the shape of griffins, sphinxes and other fantastic creatures.

=== Historical and typological evolution of the tripod ===
Early sacrificial vessels were mostly in pottery, some made as tripods but others with a continuous round base below the bowl, swelling as it goes down. At the end of the Geometric period an innovation is introduced: the tripods are detached from the large bronze cauldron (lebes), which is now placed on them. In the museum there is a distinctive specimen: on a fine, bronze tripod standing on cast legs, lay a large globular cauldron. On its lip there are developed heads of griffins and lions, as well as winged female figures, possibly sirens. These creatures originate from the Middle East, whereas the technique of casting followed by hammering also alludes to oriental workshops. In reference to Ancient Greek tripod cauldrons, after the 8th century most increased in both size and amount of detail, becoming more decorative, and were used almost exclusively as dedication to the gods in sanctuaries.

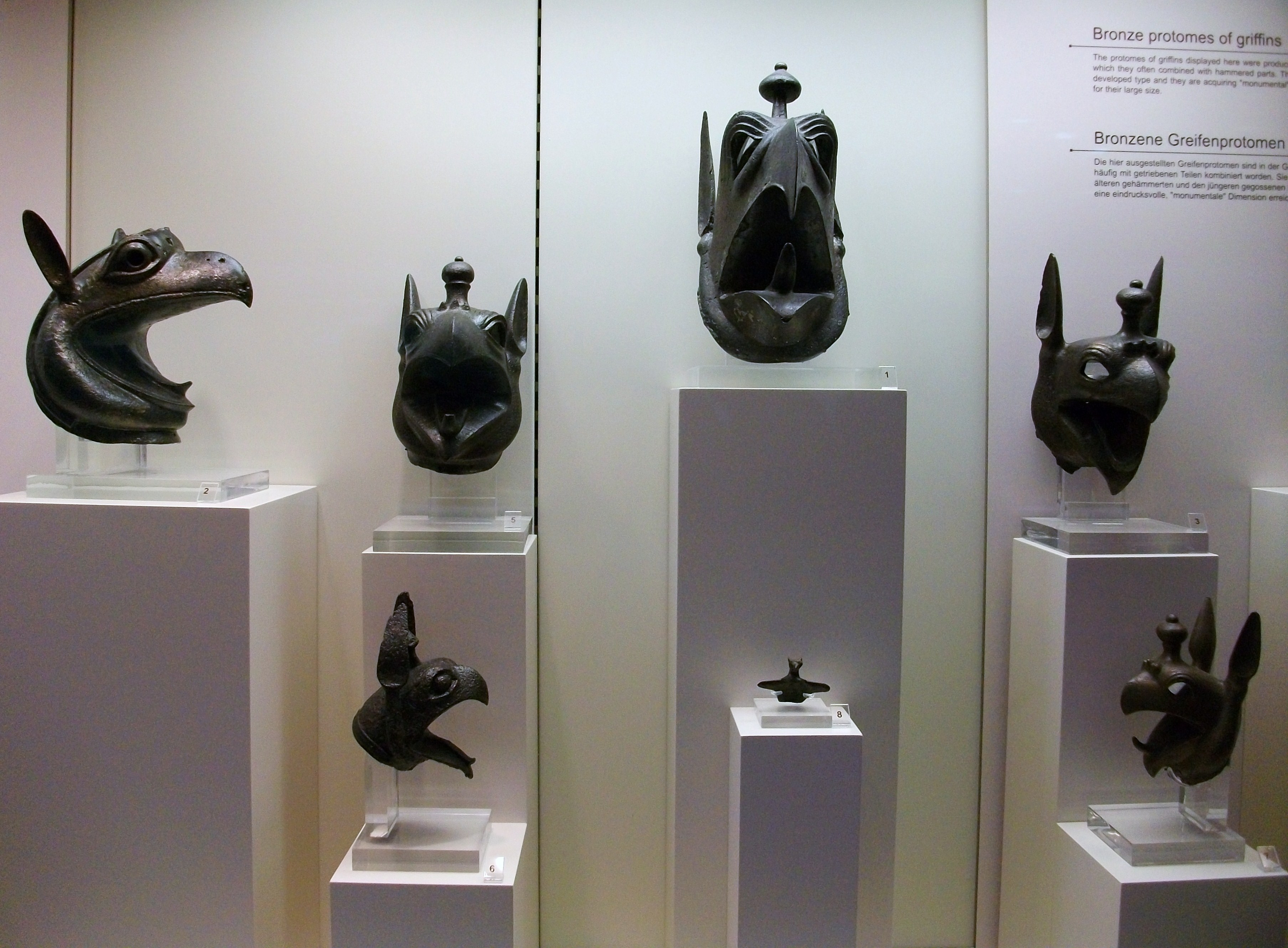
Griffins from Olympia, 7th century BC

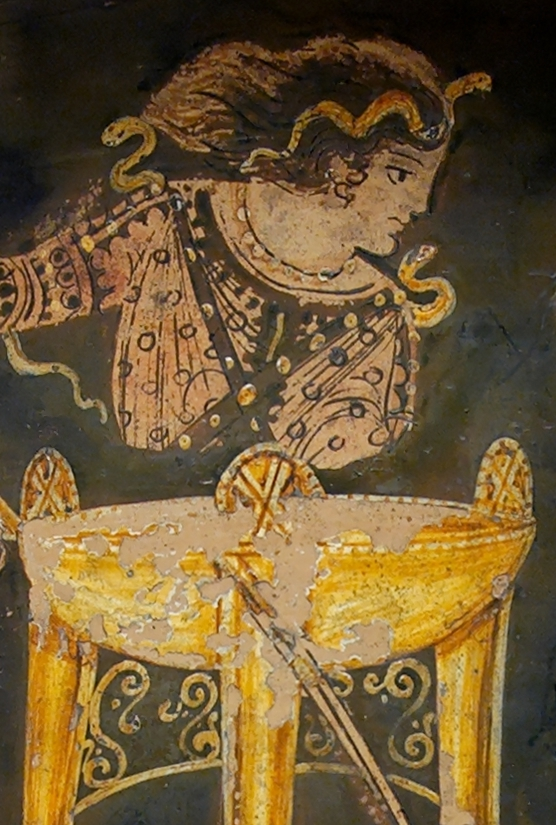
Delphic tripod (red-figured bell-krater, Paestum, c. 330 BC)

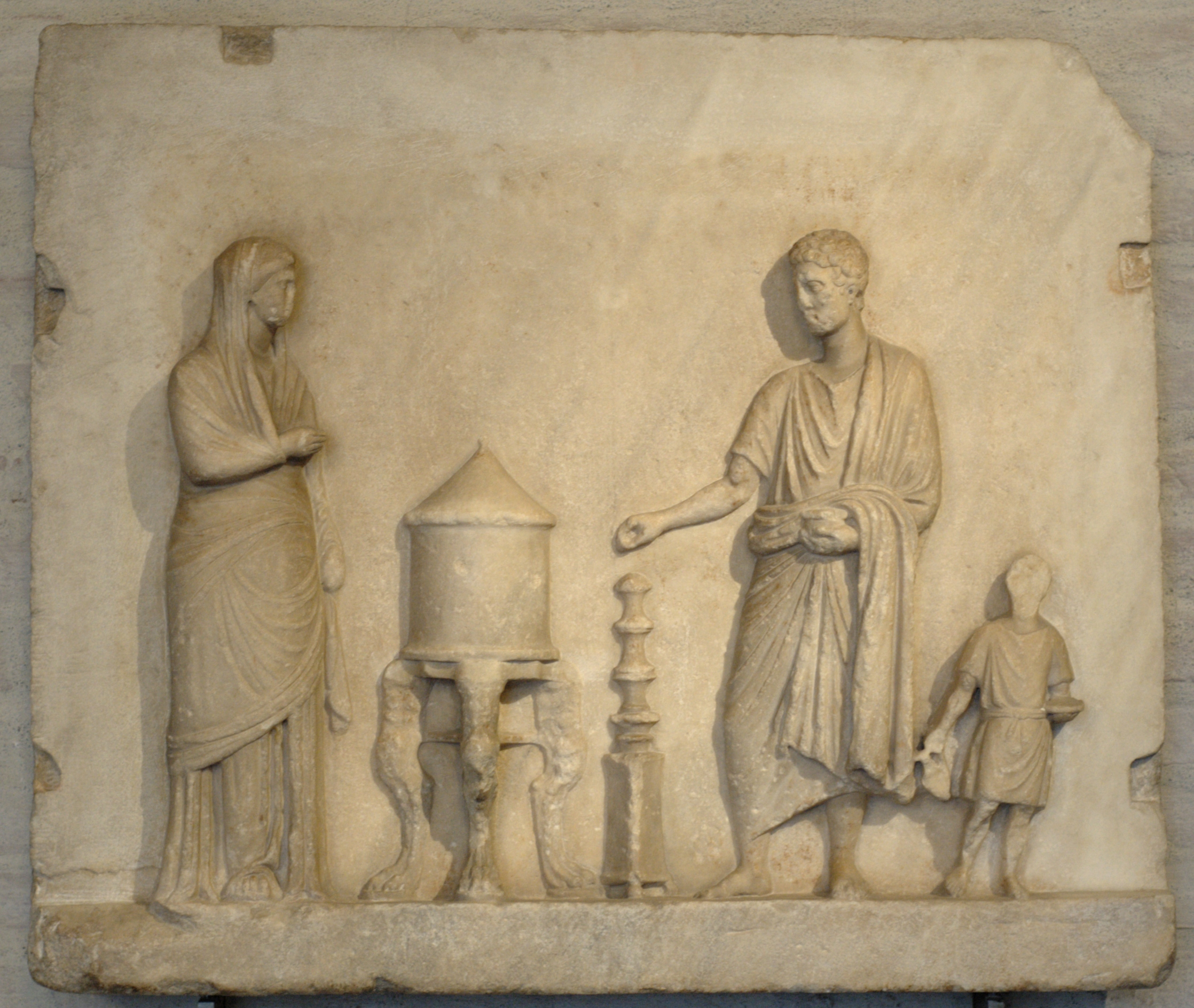
Ritual vessel supported on a tripod (Roman relief 1st-century AD)

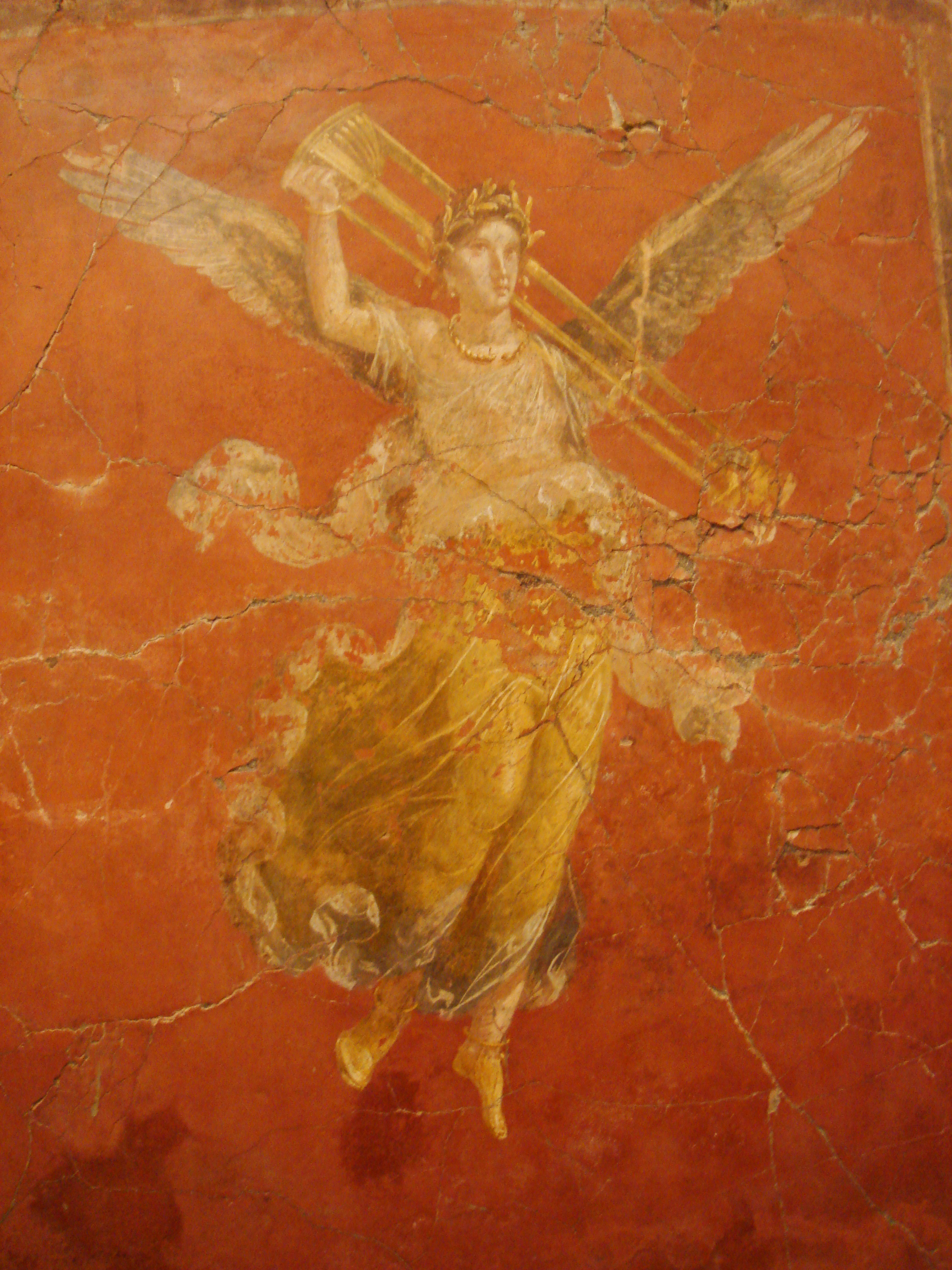
Winged Victory bearing a tripod (Wall painting, Pompeii, 64 AD)

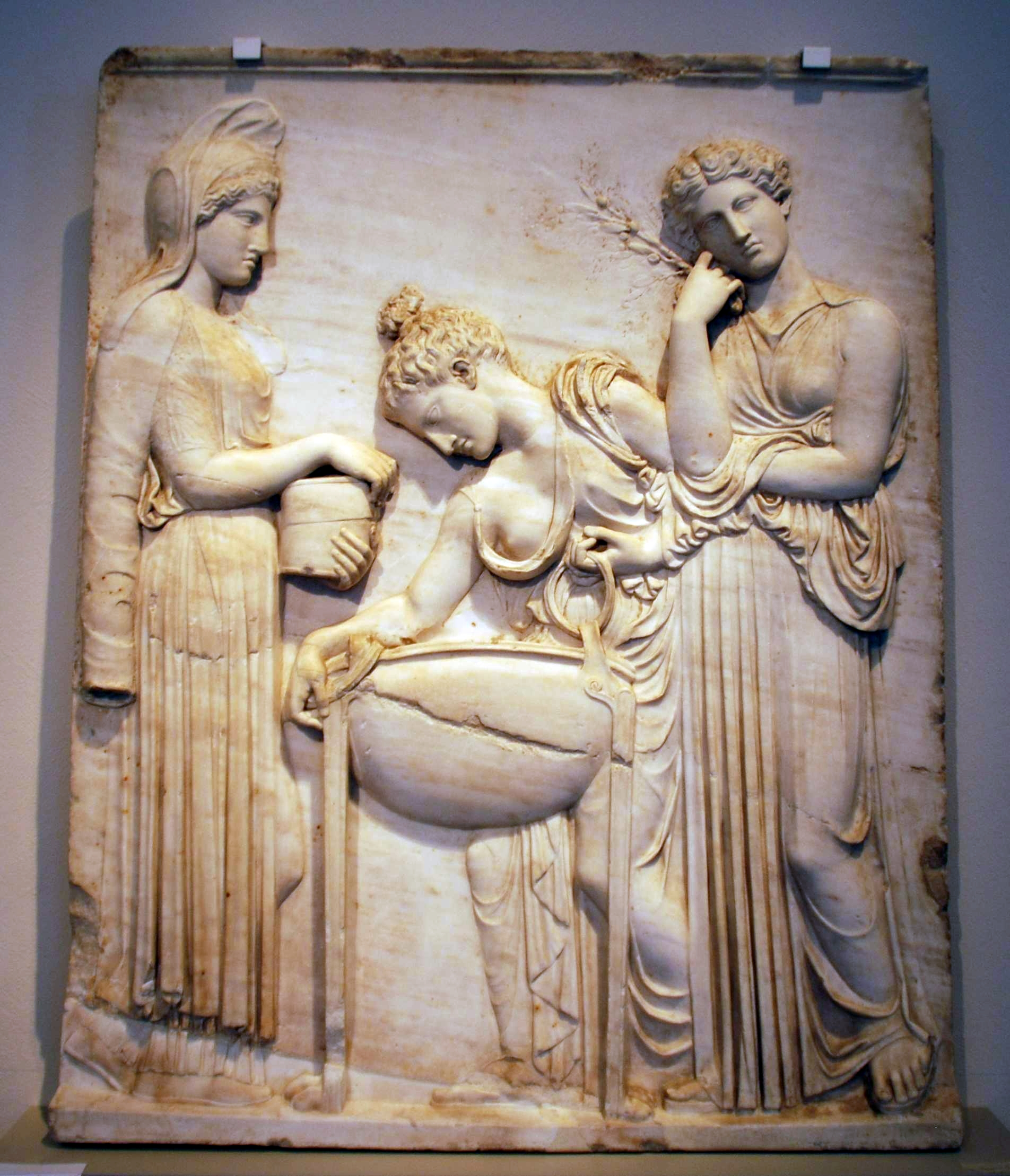
Medea and the Peliades around a tripod (1828 relief after a 5th-century BC Greek original)

== Ancient China ==
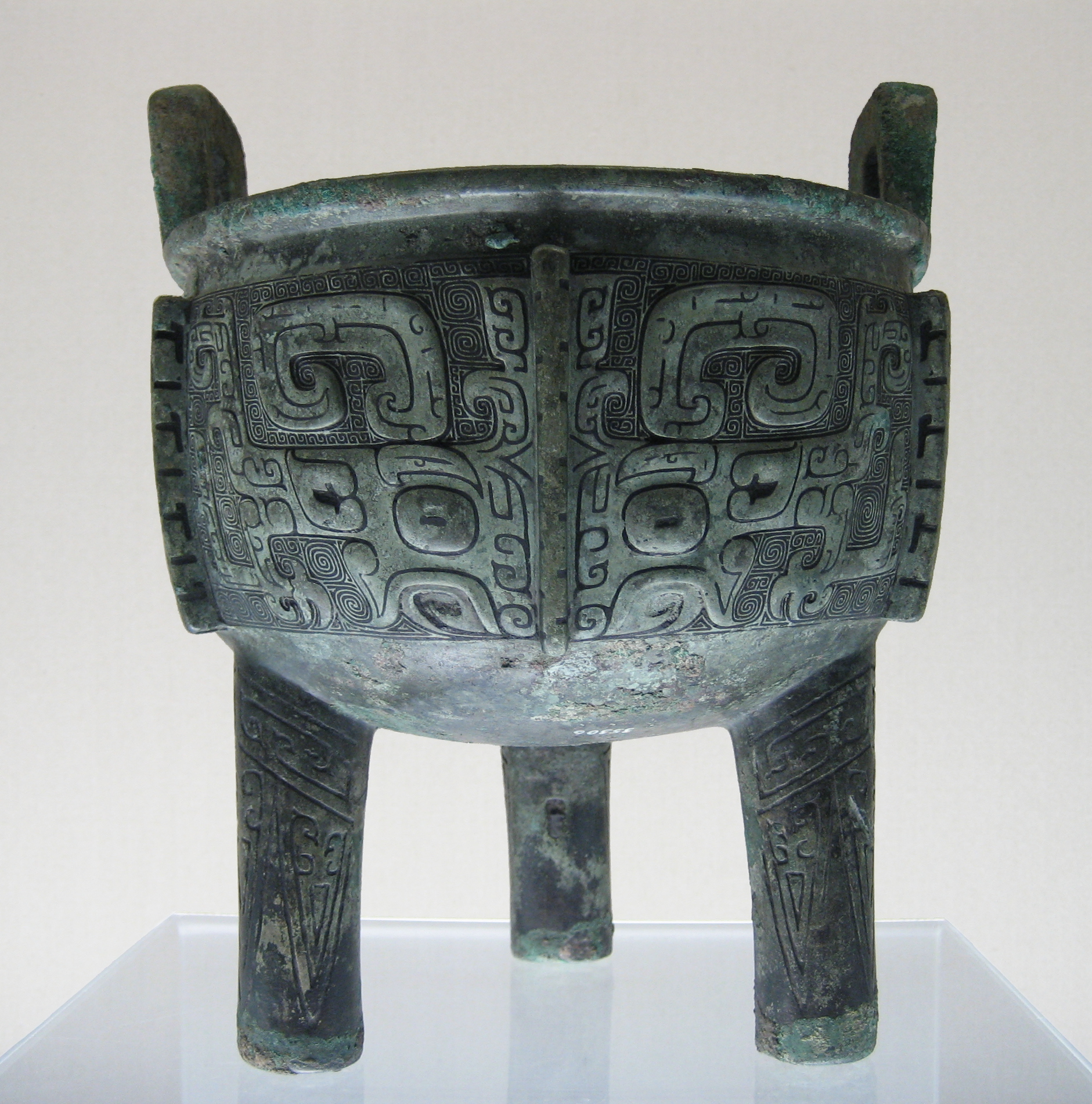
A ding from the late Shang dynasty

Tripod pottery has been part of the archaeological assemblage in China since the earliest Neolithic cultures of Cishan and Peiligang in the 7th and 8th millennium BC. Sacrificial tripods were also a common type of ritual bronze, also sometimes appearing in ceramic form. They are often referred to as "dings" and usually have three legs, but some have four legs.

The Chinese use sacrificial tripods in modern times, such as in 2005, when a "National Unity Tripod" made of bronze was presented by the central Chinese government to the government of northwest China's Xinjiang Uygur Autonomous Region to mark its fiftieth birthday. It was described as a traditional Chinese sacrificial vessel symbolizing unity.
