= Painter of the Wedding Procession =

The Painter of the Wedding Procession was an Ancient Greek vase painter working in Athens in the 300s BC, who decorated pottery primarily in the red-figure technique. He was a master of the Kerch Style. His vases are in the Getty Museum and the State Hermitage Museum.
