= Jena Painter =

Classical Greek vase painter

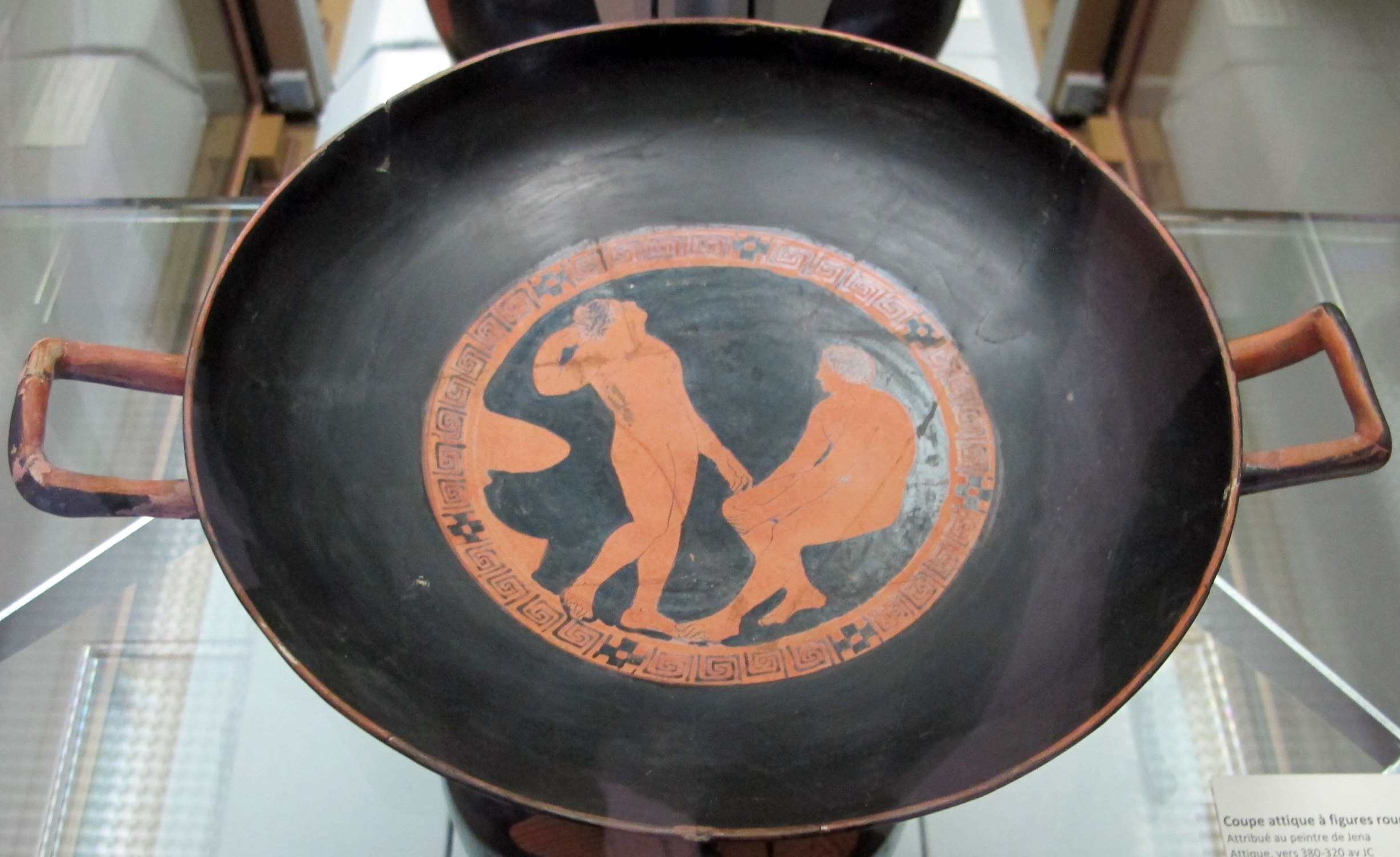
Peleus and Atalanta, Bowl, around 390 BC

The Jena Painter was an ancient Greek vase painter, active in Athens around 400 BC. He mainly painted kylikes in the red-figure technique. His stylistic and chronological place was first determined by the British Classical archaeologist, John D. Beazley. Beazley chose the conventional name "Jena Painter" because a large proportion of the artist's surviving works were in the possession of Jena University. The majority of his 91 known vessels were discovered in the Kerameikos, the potters' quarter of ancient Athens, in 1892. Many of his vessels were exported, for example to Etruria and North Africa. The Jena Painter appears to have had two assistants whose work is described as style B and style C. The Jena Painter would paint the internal images of bowls, and the style B assistant their outsides. The work of the style C assistant is known only from, bowl skyphoi and footless bowls. In contrast to his assistants' rather casual drawings, the Jena Painter is distinguished by his fine and careful drawing style and the vividness of his compositions. The Q Painter and the Diomedes Painter worked in the same workshop as the Jena Painter.

== Bibliography ==
- John D. Beazley. Attic Red Figure Vase Painters. Oxford: Clarendon Press, 1963.
- Werner Müller. Keramik des Altertums. Vasen aus der Sammlung Antiker Kleinkunst Jena. Leipzig, 1963.
- John Boardman. Athenian Red Figure Vases: The Classical Period. London, 1989, p. 169f.
- Verena Paul-Zinserling. Der Jena-Maler und sein Kreis: zur Ikonologie einer attischen Schalenwerkstatt um 400 v. Chr. Mainz 1994.
- Lehrstuhl für Klassische Archäologie und Sammlung Antiker Kleinkunst der Friedrich-Schiller-Universität Jena (Angelika Geyer (ed.)): Der Jenaer Maler: eine Töpferwerkstatt im klassischen Athen. Wiesbaden 1996. ISBN 3-88226-864-6.
