= Lèbes gamikòs =

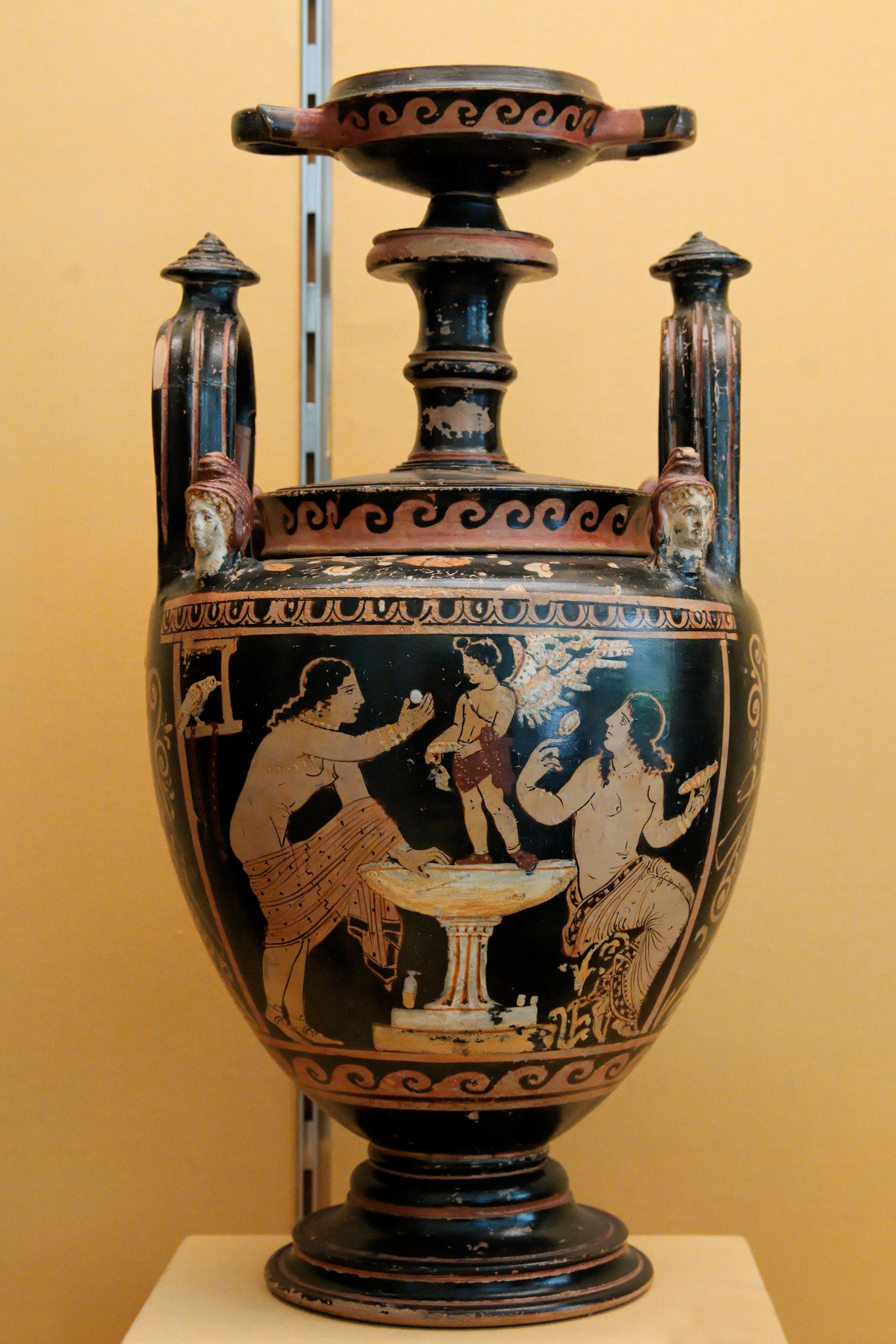
Lèbes gamikòs by Asteas, c. 340 BC, National Archaeological Museum of Spain

The lèbes gamikòs or "nuptial lebes" (pl.: lèbetes gamikòi) is a form of ancient Greek pottery used in marriage ceremonies (literally, it means marriage vase). It was probably used in the ritual sprinkling of the bride with water before the wedding. In form, it has a large bowl-like body and a stand that can be long or short. Painted scenes are placed on either the body of the vessel or the stand.

One of the earliest lèbetes gamikòi was apparently painted by a follower of Sophilos (c. 580–570). It was decorated with the wedding procession of Helen and Menelaus.

A typical lèbes gamikòs shows wedding scenes (including mythic weddings such as the wedding of Peleus and Thetis, but the iconography can also be related to scenes such as mimes).
