= Lebes =

Type of ancient Greek cauldron

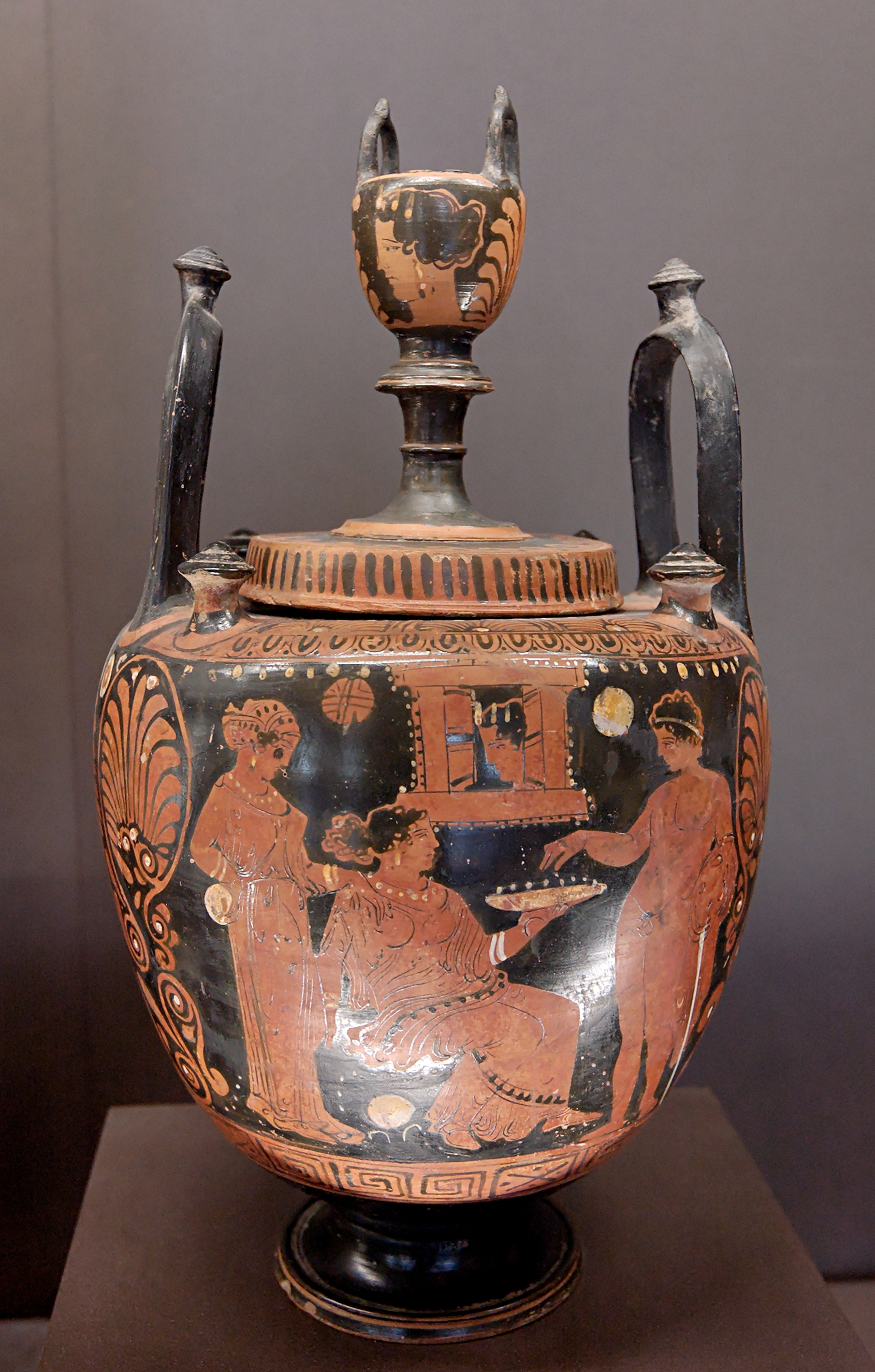
Lebes gamikos, a vessel that was part of an ancient Greek wedding.

The lebes (Ancient Greek: λέβης, romanized: lébēs, plural lebetes) is a type of ancient Greek cauldron, normally in bronze. It is a deep bowl with a rounded bottom. It was often supported by a sacrificial tripod. In classical times, a foot was attached and it was typically used as a cooking pot.

== Variants ==
=== Tripod lebes ===
The tripod lebes is characterized by two round vertical handles and by three strut-supported legs. All were separately cast then riveted to the cauldron. Artefactual evidence indicates the tripod lebes was not used as a mixing bowl, even long after it lost its role as a cooking pot.

=== Lebes gamikos ===
The lebes gamikos (pl. lebetes gamikoi), or nuptial lebes, appears to have been a part of pre-wedding purification ceremonies, and was often made in pottery. It may have stood by the bride's door and was probably used in ritual sprinkling of the bride with water.

Lebetes gamikoi stood on variously long or short bases and each typically was painted with a scene of a wedding procession. Oftentimes, the wedding depicted was mythic (such as the wedding of Peleus and Thetis) or included mythic elements such as chariots bearing Helen and Menelaos.

== Value ==
Just as the Dorians of what is now the country of the “Five Cities”—formerly the country of “the Six Cities”—forbid admitting any of the neighboring Dorians to the Triopian temple, and even barred from using it those of their own group who had broken the temple law. For long ago, in the games in honor of Triopian Apollo, they offered certain bronze tripods to the victors; and those who won these were not to carry them away from the temple but dedicate them there to the god. Now when a man of Halicarnassus called Agasicles won, he disregarded this law, and, carrying the tripod away, nailed it to the wall of his own house. For this offense the five cities—Lindus, Ialysus, Camirus, Cos, and Cnidus—forbade the sixth city—Halicarnassus—to share in the use of the temple. Such was the penalty imposed on the Halicarnassians.

— Herodotus, The Histories (ed. A. D. Godley), Book I, chapter 144, sections 1–3

Under the barter system that existed in early Iron Age Greece, goods and services were directly exchanged without the use of an exchange medium (money). However, such transactions were aided by conventionally accepted reference values. Certain commodities were often used as reference points for evaluating the relative values of different goods. Cattle was common as such a reference in many early cultures. In Greece during this period, in addition to cattle, bronze and iron items—specifically lebetes—were also common.

Remnants of stone inscriptions preserve numerous examples of fines and compensatory damages denominated in bronze lebetes from ancient Crete, as early as the 7th century BCE. For example, in one instance, a bronze tripod "of [worth] ten lebetes" was recorded as payment for a fine.

In the Iliad, a bronze lebes was valued at one ox. By the Hellenistic period, long after the introduction of coin based money, the lebes survived as a term for a quantity of silver coinage.
