= Sophilos =

Ancient Greek vase painter

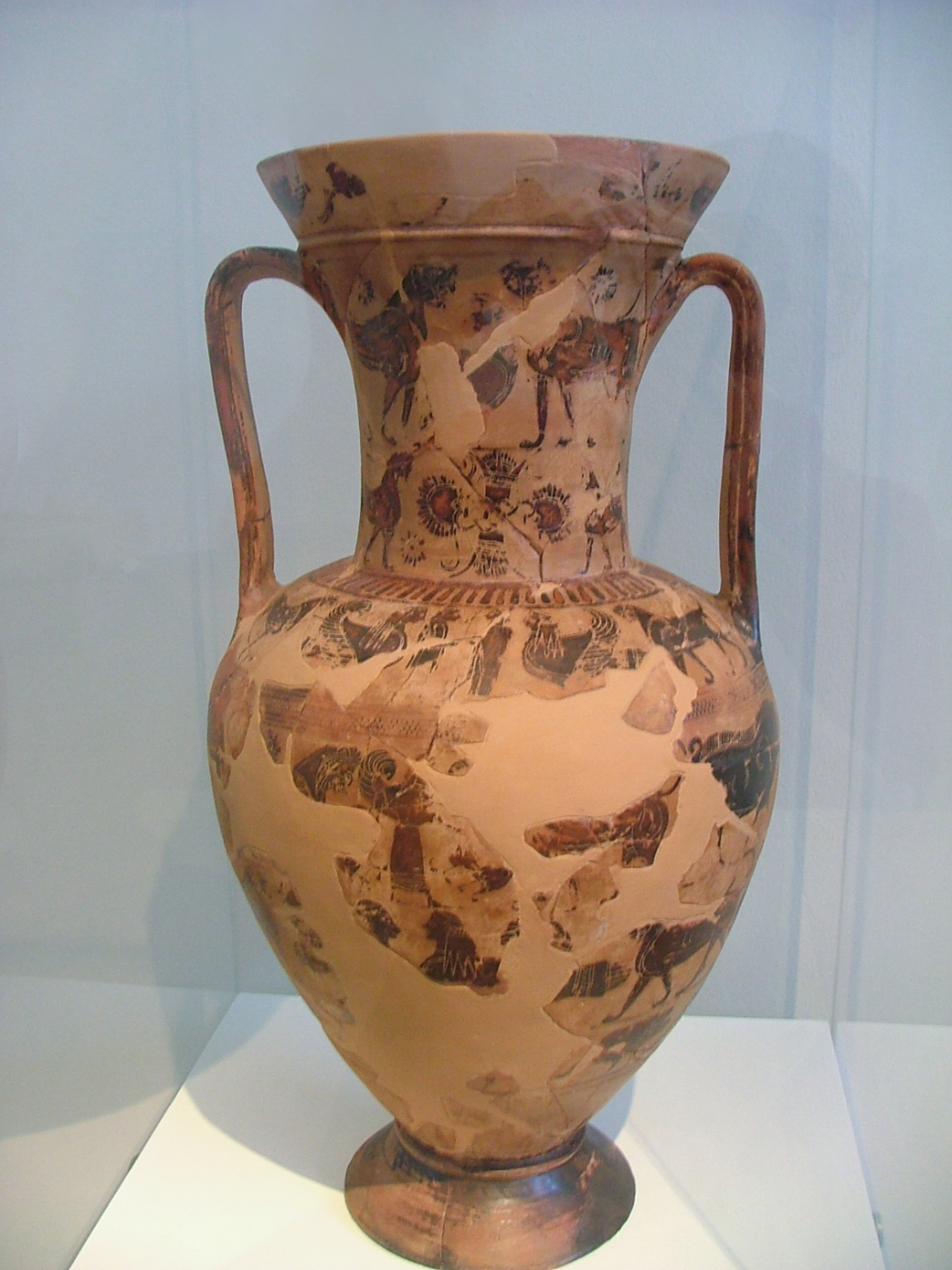
- Attic black-figure amphora. Late work of the vase-painter, Sophilos, ca. 580 B.C. On the neck is Hermes, between Sphinxes. On the body are zones decorated with a winged Artemis, animals, florals, sphinxes, and geese. Found at Marathon, in the tumulus of the Athenians (490 B.C.).
- Born: Sophilos; Before 590 BC; Probably Athens
- Died: Around 570 BC
- Known for: Ceramics manufacturer and painter
- Notable work: 37 vessels are ascribed to him, mostly amphorae, '’dinoi’’, kraters, as well as three pinakes
- Movement: Black-figure style

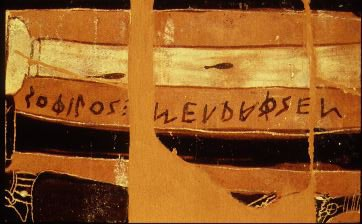
Sophilos' signature: "sophilos m' egraphsen" (“Sophilos painted me”)

Sophilos (Ancient Greek: Σώφιλος; active about 590 – 570 BC) was an Attic potter and vase painter in the black-figure style. Sophilos is the oldest Attic vase painter so far to be known by his true name. Fragments of two wine basins (dinoi) in Athens are signed by him, indicating that he both potted and painted them. In total, 37 vessels are ascribed to him, mostly amphorae, dinoi, kraters, as well as three pinakes. Apart from his work for the domestic market, he was also one of the masters of major significance in the process of supplanting the dominance of Corinthian vase painting in the markets of Etruria, and Southern Italy, the most important export area for Greek vases. His works were exported as far as the Black Sea region, Syria and Egypt (Naukratis).

He was one of the first painters to use additional colours at a grand scale, thus increasing the optical and artistic distinction between Corinthian and Attic vase painting. While he was conservative and traditionalist in terms of the ornamentation and animal figures he used, his intervening figural scenes, mostly of mythological motifs, were entirely innovative. He broke up established standard scenes, had figures act individually, and found clever and unconventional new ways of structuring the narrative. As his artistic style progressed, he increasingly pushed ornamental designs into the margin, as his figural scenes became more and more important. Stylistically, his work is close to that of the late Gorgon Painter, whose style he developed further, to be continued later by Klitias, and culminate in the François vase.

In spite of his innovative pictorial compositions and his talent to constantly invent new scenes; his drawing style was usually not very accurate. The overall impact of his works is hardly diminished by that.

== Works (selection) ==
- Athens, National Archaeological Museum

Neck amphora 991 • Chalice krater 995 • Neck amphora 1036 • Fragment of a '’dinos’’ 15499

- formerly Berlin, Antikensammlung

Belly amphora F 1683 (lost 1945)

- Boston, Museum of Fine Arts

Tripod kothon98.915

- Jena, Friedrich-Schiller-Universität

Amphora

- London, British Museum

’’Dinos’’ 1971.11-11

== Bibliography ==
- John Beazley: Attic Black-Figure Vase-Painters, Oxford 1956, p. 37-42.
- Güven Bakır: Sophilos. Ein Beitrag zu seinem Stil. Mainz 1981. ISBN 3-8053-0446-3
- Künstlerlexikon der Antike II (2004) p. 407-408 s.v. Sophilos (I) (Bettina Kreuzer)

== See also ==
- Corpus vasorum antiquorum
