= South Italian ancient Greek pottery =

Ancient Greek pottery manufactured in modern-day southern Italy

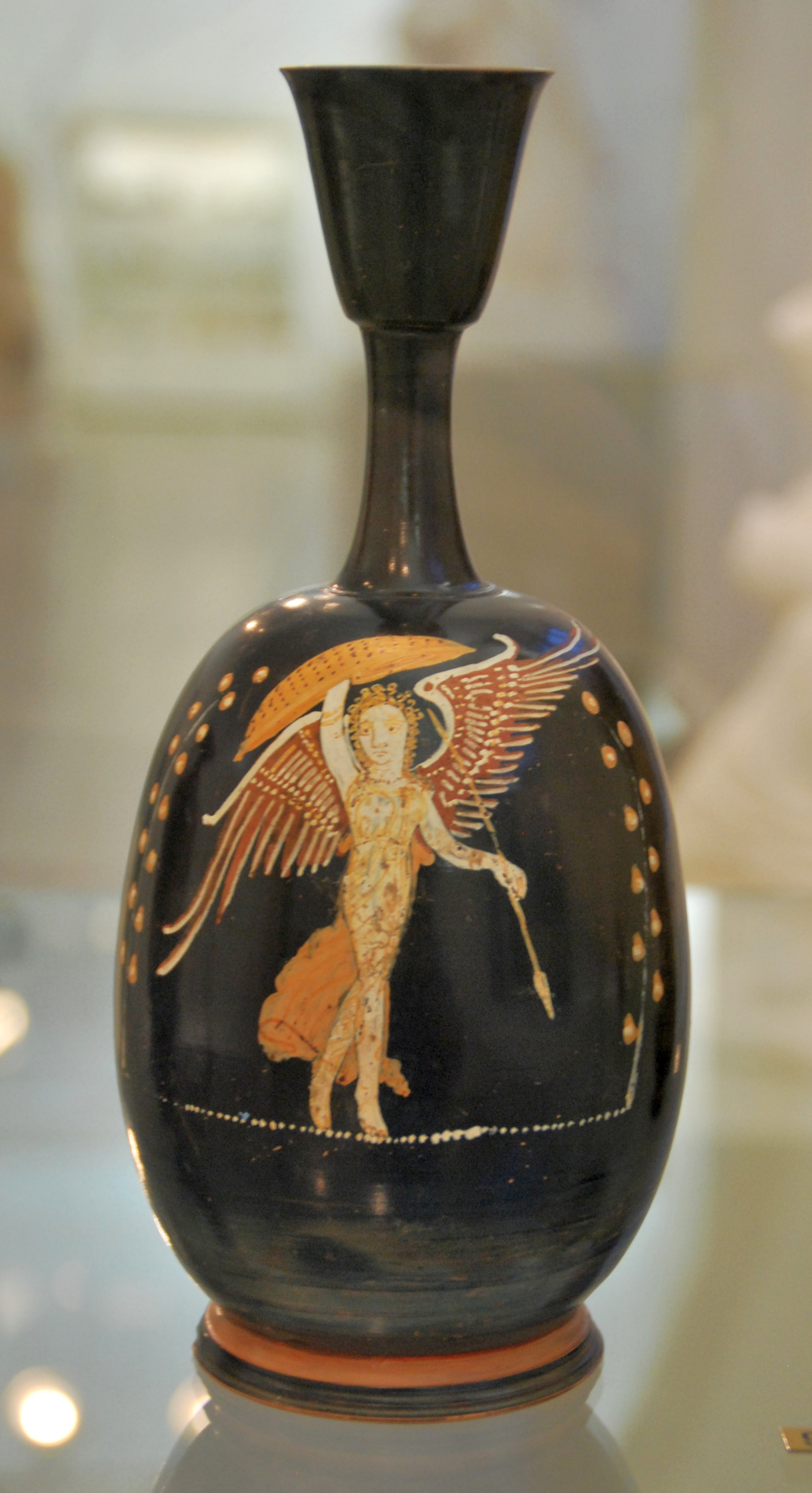
A lekythos Gnathia vase depicting an armed and dancing goddess Nike

South Italian is a designation for ancient Greek pottery fabricated in Magna Graecia largely during the 4th century BC. The fact that Greek Southern Italy produced its own red-figure pottery as early as the end of the 5th century BC was first established by Adolf Furtwaengler in 1893 (A.D. Trendall). Prior to that this pottery had been first designated as "Etruscan" and then as "Attic." Archaeological proof that this pottery was actually being produced in South Italy first came in 1973 when a workshop and kilns with misfirings and broken wares was first excavated at Metaponto, proving that the Amykos Painter was located there rather than in Athens (A.D. Trendall, p. 17).

== Overview ==
The interchange of iconography, techniques, and ideas between the major pottery centers of the Hellenistic Period was formidable. One can see the influences of Corinth, Athens, Etruria, and cross pollination throughout the fabrics of Magna Graecia. There are five regions which produced South Italian ware: Apulia, Lucania, Paestum, Campania, and Sicily. These regions, in turn, had various workshops within them.

- Apulian ware was almost all made in various workshops in Taras (Taranto).
- Lucanian ware was made in Heraclea and Metaponto.
- Paestan ware was all made in Poseidonia (Paestum).
- Campanian ware was made in Capua and Kyme (Cumae).
- Sicilian ware was made in Syracuse and Lipari.

Later centers also developed in Teano (Campania), Canosa (Apulia), and Gnathia (Apulia), but these potteries are moving away from Classical red figure towards the less figurative work of the later Hellenistic and Graeco-Roman Periods.

All South Italian fabrics were originally scions from the Attic workshops of Athens, when artists began to leave that city following the Peloponnesian Wars. The earliest workshops seem to have been founded in Lucania, and Apulia. Others were founded in Sicily, and then scions from the Sicilian workshops established those in Paestum and Campania.

South Italian ware illustrates many ancient Greek dramas and myths which are unknown in Mainland Greek pottery fabrics like those of Athens (Attic ware), Sparta (Laconian ware), and Corinth (Corinthian ware).

Almost all of the pottery forms developed in Greece were also produced in South Italy. However, South Italian potters developed some of these traditional forms in new directions. For instance, Apulian potters take the volute krater and loutrophoros to new heights of fancy, making them far more elaborate than their Athenian forerunners. Apulian potters, having a taste for the frilly and elaborate, take traditional forms such as the Panathenaic amphora, the oinochoe, the lekythos, attenuate their forms, exaggerate their flares, add volute handles, molded gorgoneia, affectionately dubbed "macaroons", and end up with extremely elegant new varieties of pottery which still fit within the Hellenistic aesthetic, and end up becoming standard in the subsequent Graeco-Roman world.

New Italiote forms come about through experimentation and borrowing from local Italic cultures. In Campania, the bail amphora was invented. This is an amphora shape which has a single handle across the mouth rather than the usual double handles on the neck or shoulder. Local Italic forms made by native peoples were also borrowed into the South Italian repertoire. The Messapian trozzella is borrowed and becomes the nestoris, an elaborate form having a large belly, a pair of lug handles, a pair of neck to shoulder handles, and molded rosettes.

Some elements of decoration were also innovative. Apulian artists use polychromatic, coiling tendrils and flower forms including roses, poppies, and whirling swirls to fill necks and other traditionally black areas of vases. Frequent use is made of portrait or cameo faces of nymphs and satyrs. Rosettes, vine leaves, and other fillers get more and more elaborate. Italiote artists also created a technique called "sovradipinto," in which multiple layers of colored slips were used to add chiaroscuro (highlight and lowlight) for figures and decorations. The Campanian artists seem to have favored the use of a broader palette of colors than the other fabrics, often making female figures with white skin, while leaving male figures in red, and then adding many purple red, yellow, and white details all over the vases. Italiote artists were also extremely adept at using the false red figure technique, also known as Six's technique. This is the application of red and white slips on top of the black gloss rather than leaving figures and designs in reserve, as was the usual Athenian custom. This technique was also very popular in Etruria and may hail from that region.

== Gallery ==
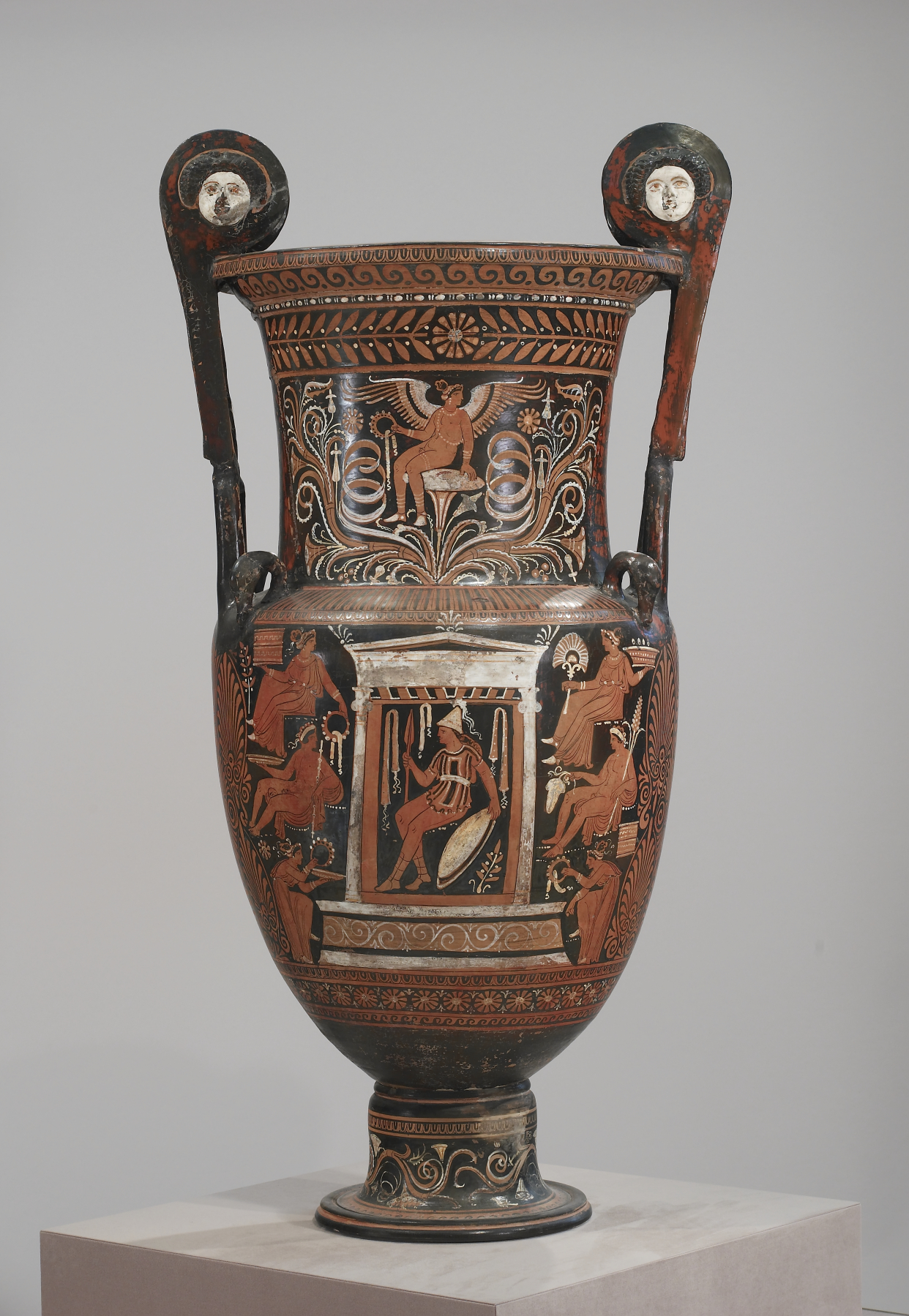
Apulian vase painting

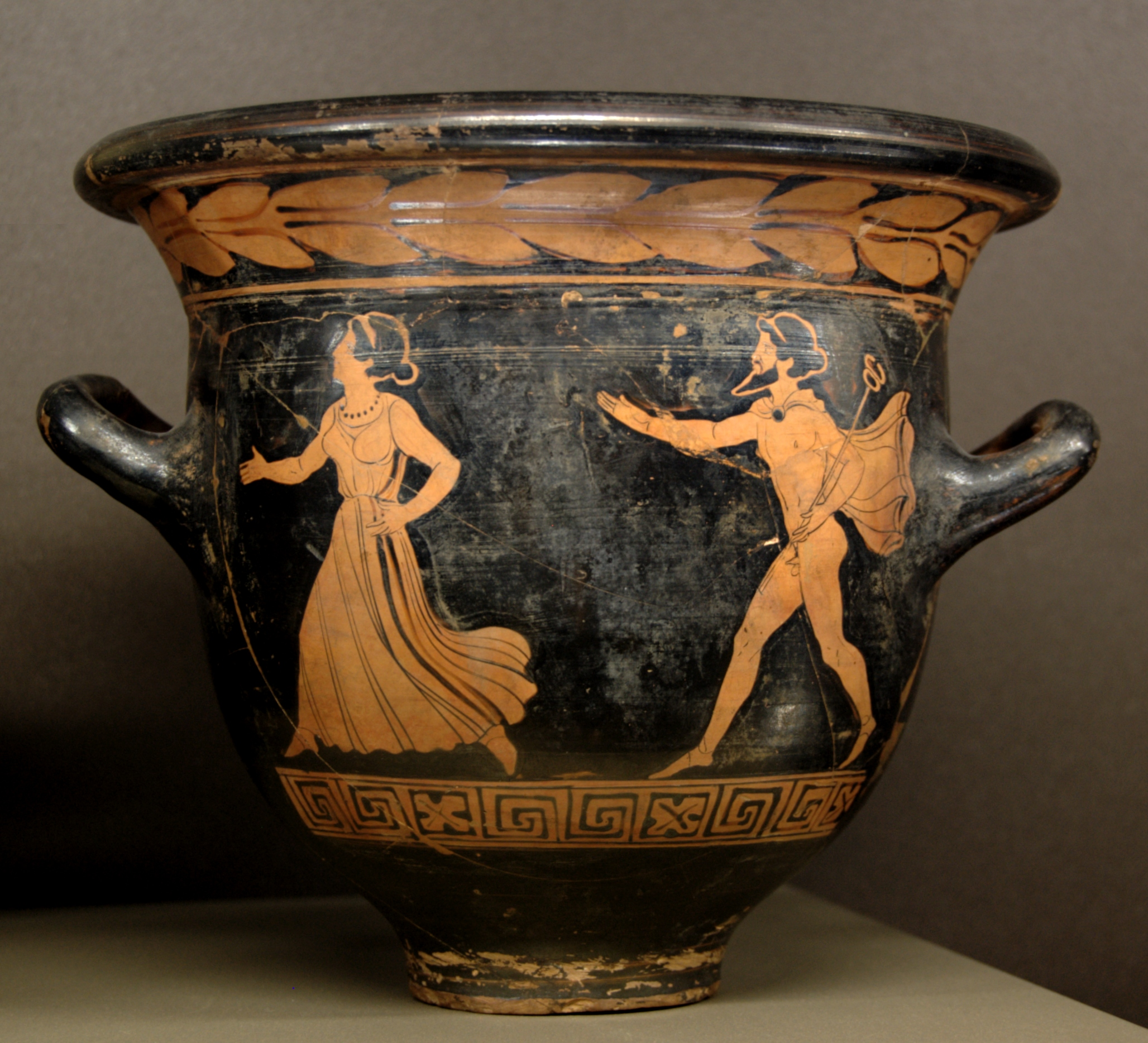
Lucanian vase painting

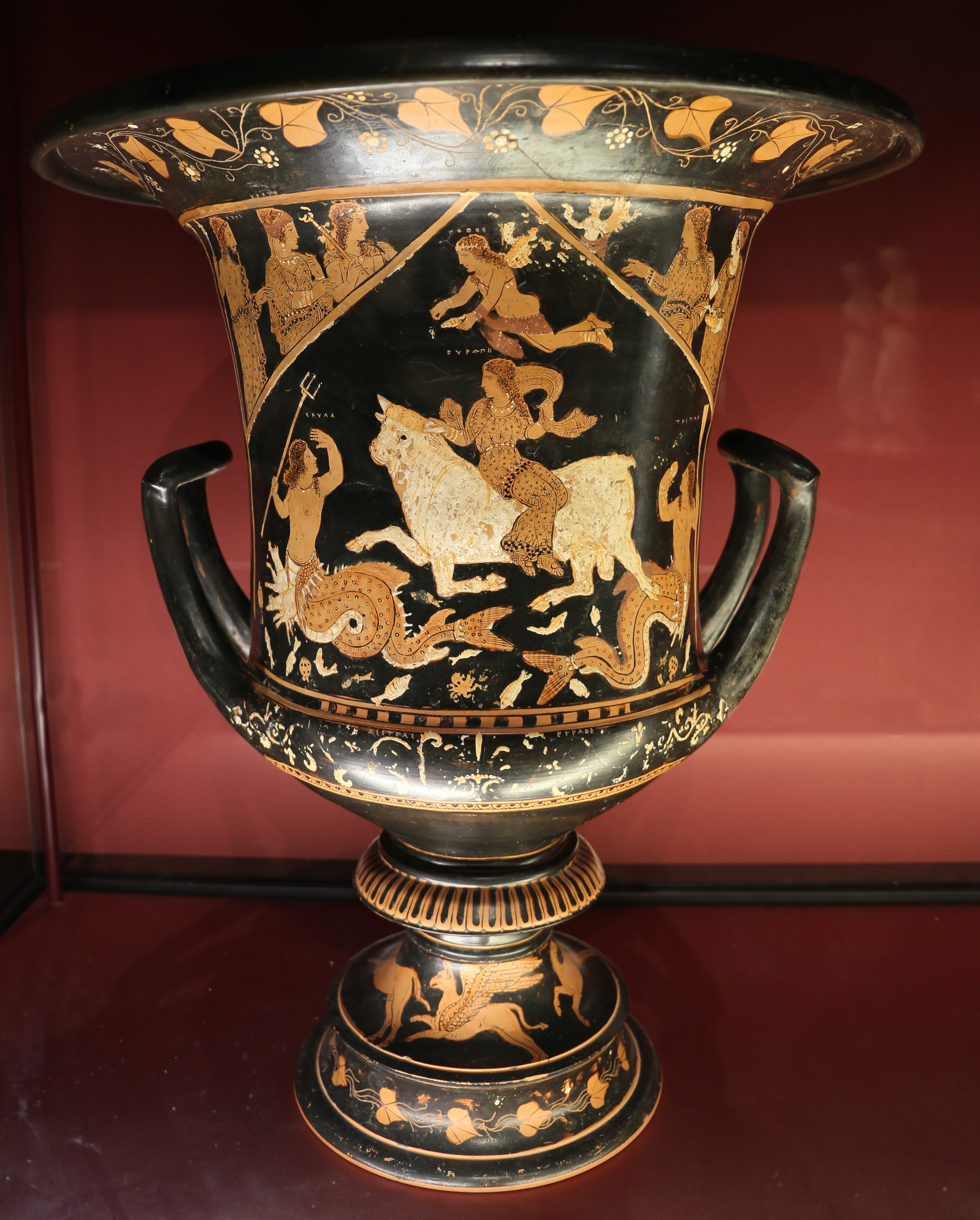
Paestan vase painting

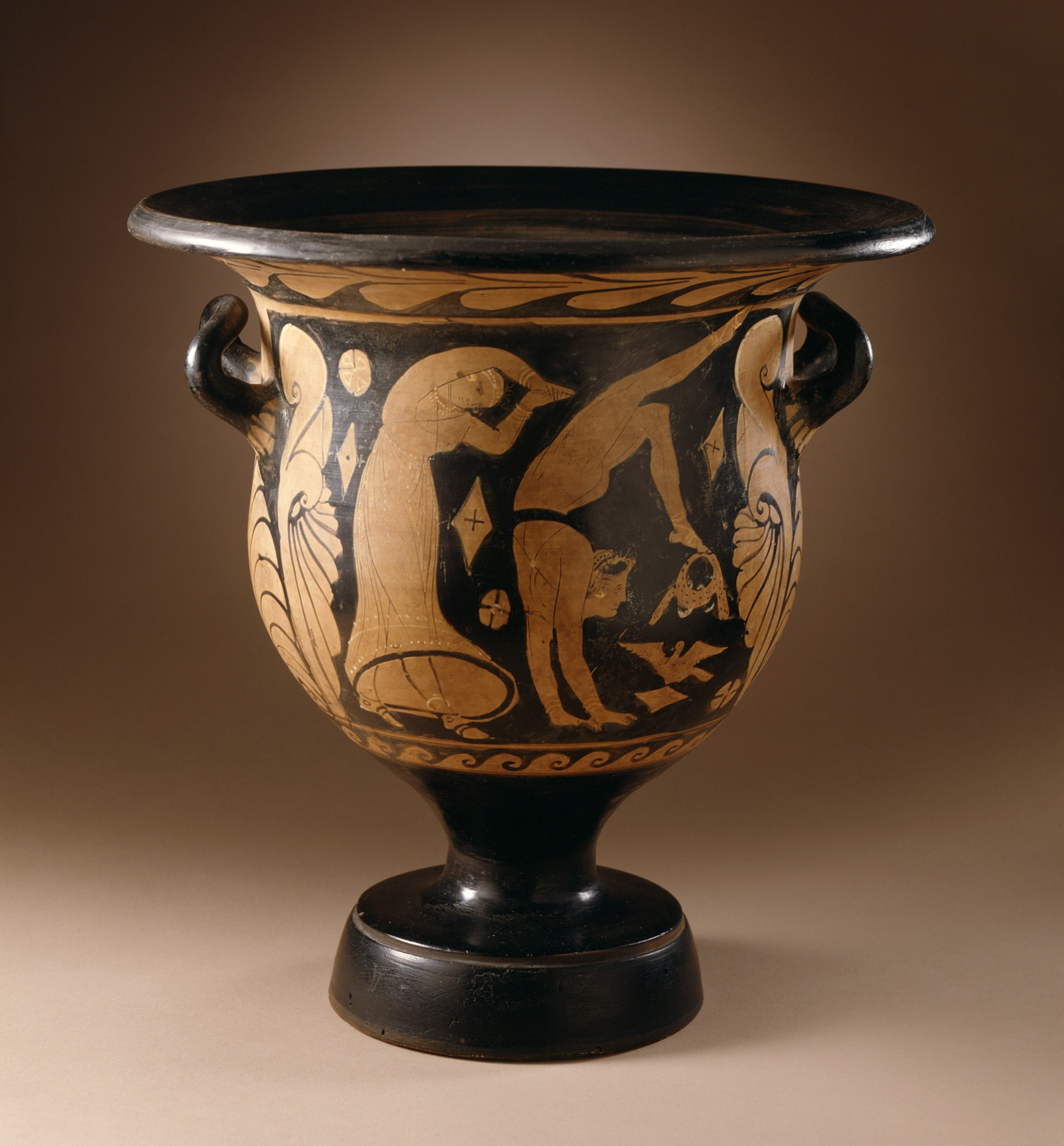
Campanian vase painting

== Bibliography ==
- South Italian Vase Painting by A.D. Trendall
- Red Figure Vases of South Italy and Sicily by A.D. Trendall
