= Sicilian vase painting =

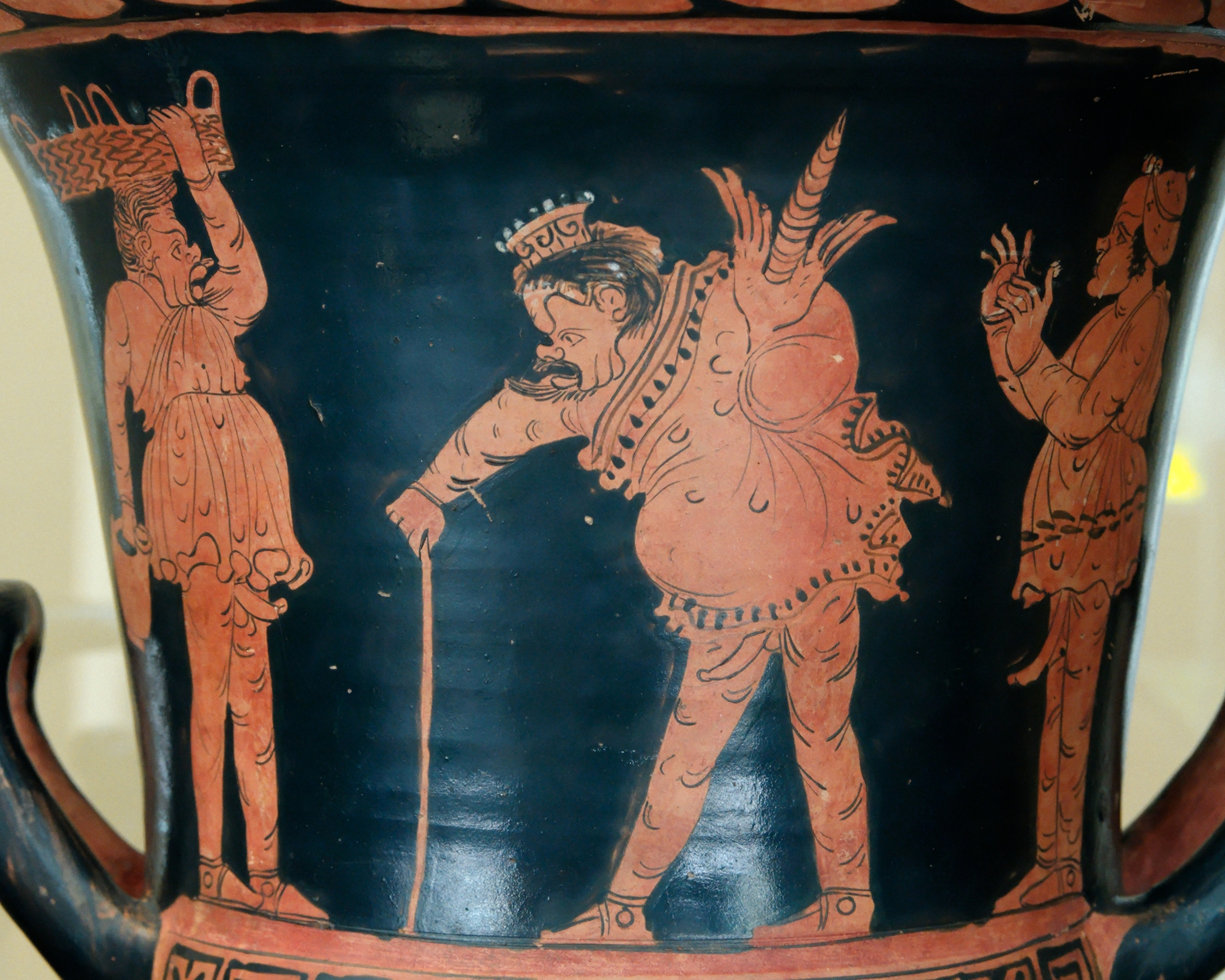
Phlyax scene on a krater by the Dirce Painter, circa 360/340 BC. Madrid: National Archaeological Museum of Spain.

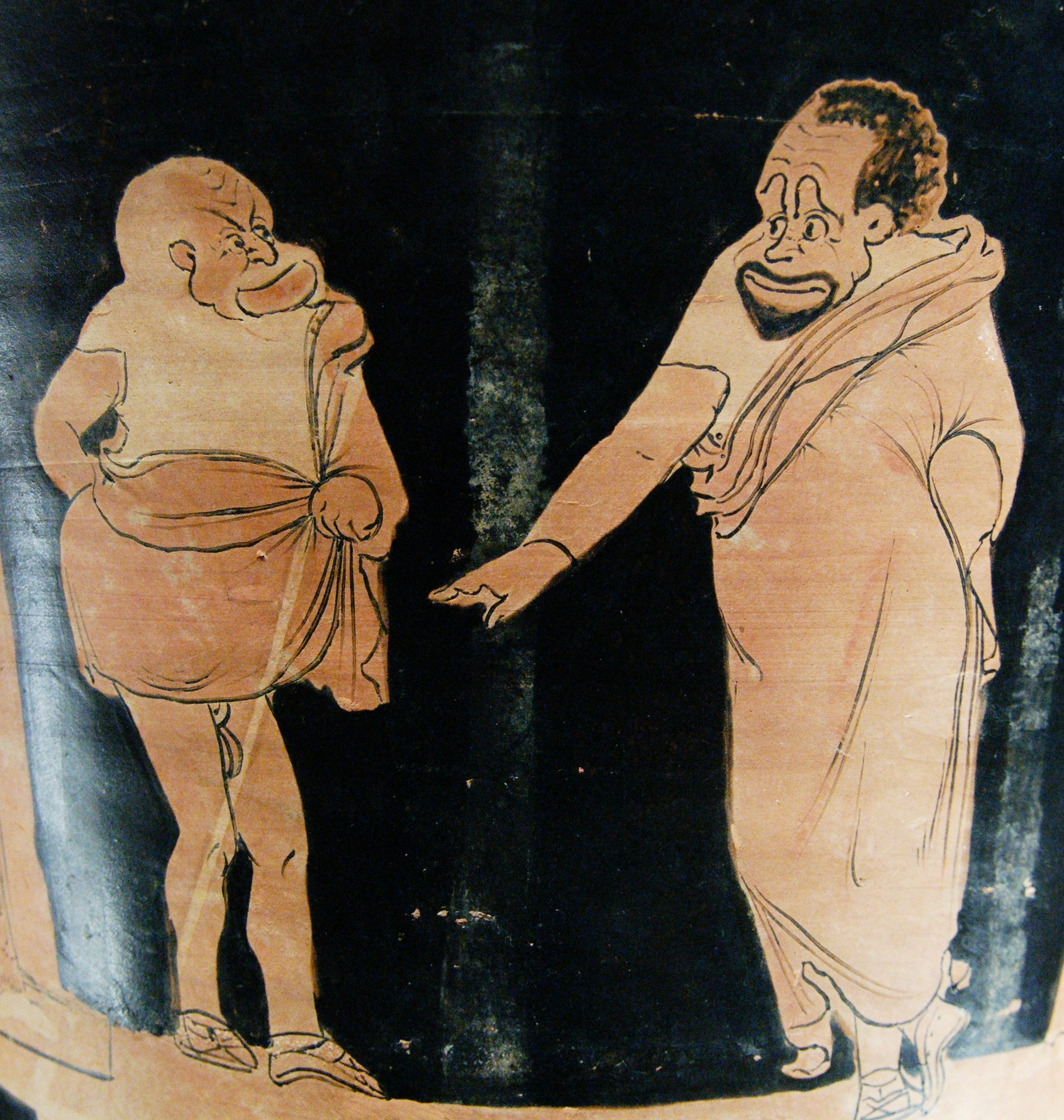
Phlyax scene on a krater by the Lentini-Manfria Group: a master and his slave in a short peplos, circa 350/340 BC. Paris: Louvre.

Sicilian vase painting was a regional style of South Italian red-figure vase painting fabricated in Magna Graecia. It was one of five South Italian regional styles. The vase painting of Sicily was especially closely connected with the Lucanian and Paestan styles.

== Overview ==
The beginnings of Sicilian vase painting remain mysterious. Production began before the end of the 5th century BC in the cities of Himera and Syracusae. In terms of style, themes, ornamentation and vase shapes, the workshops closely followed Attic examples. The influence of the Attic Late Classical Medias Painter is especially striking. It is possible that the first potters and painters were Athenian prisoners of war (see Sicilian Expedition). The Chessboard Painter, one of the first Sicilian vase painters, had apparently been trained by the Attic Pothos Painter. His pupil, the Dirke Painter, established the typical Sicilian technique. In the second quarter of the 4th century BC, potters who had emigrated from Sicily to Capua and Cumae in Campania and to Paestum founded production centres there. Only Syracusae retained a limited vase production then.

The typical Sicilian vase painting only came into existence around 340 BC. Three groups of workshops can be distinguished. The first, known as the Lentini-Manfria Group was active in Syracuase and Gela, a second group (Centuripe Ware) was based near Mount Aetna, a third on Lipari. The clay of the vases is pale pink, the black paint is off matt tone and has a tendency to flake off easily. Particularly typical of Sicilian vase painting is the use of additional colours, notably of white paint. Especially in the initial phase, large vessels such as chalice kraters, volute kraters and hydriai were painted, but small vessels such as bottles, lekanes, lekythoi and skyphoid pyxides are also typical. Popular themes included scenes from female life, erotes, women's heads and phlyax scenes. Mythological motifs are rare. Like in other areas, vase painting in Sicily ceased around 300 BC.

Sicilian vase painting was only recognised relatively late. By now, about 1,000 vases are known.

== Bibliography ==
- Thomas Mannack: Griechische Vasenmalerei. Eine Einführung. Theiss, Stuttgart 2002, p. 164f. ISBN 3-8062-1743-2.
- Matthias Steinhart: Sizilische Vasen. In: Der Neue Pauly. vol 11, 2001, cols. 606-607.
- Arthur Dale Trendall: Rotfigurige Vasen aus Unteritalien und Sizilien. Ein Handbuch. von Zabern, Mainz 1991 (Kulturgeschichte der Antiken Welt Vol. 47), ISBN 3-8053-1111-7 (esp. p. 36-38, 265-289)
