= Campanian vase painting =

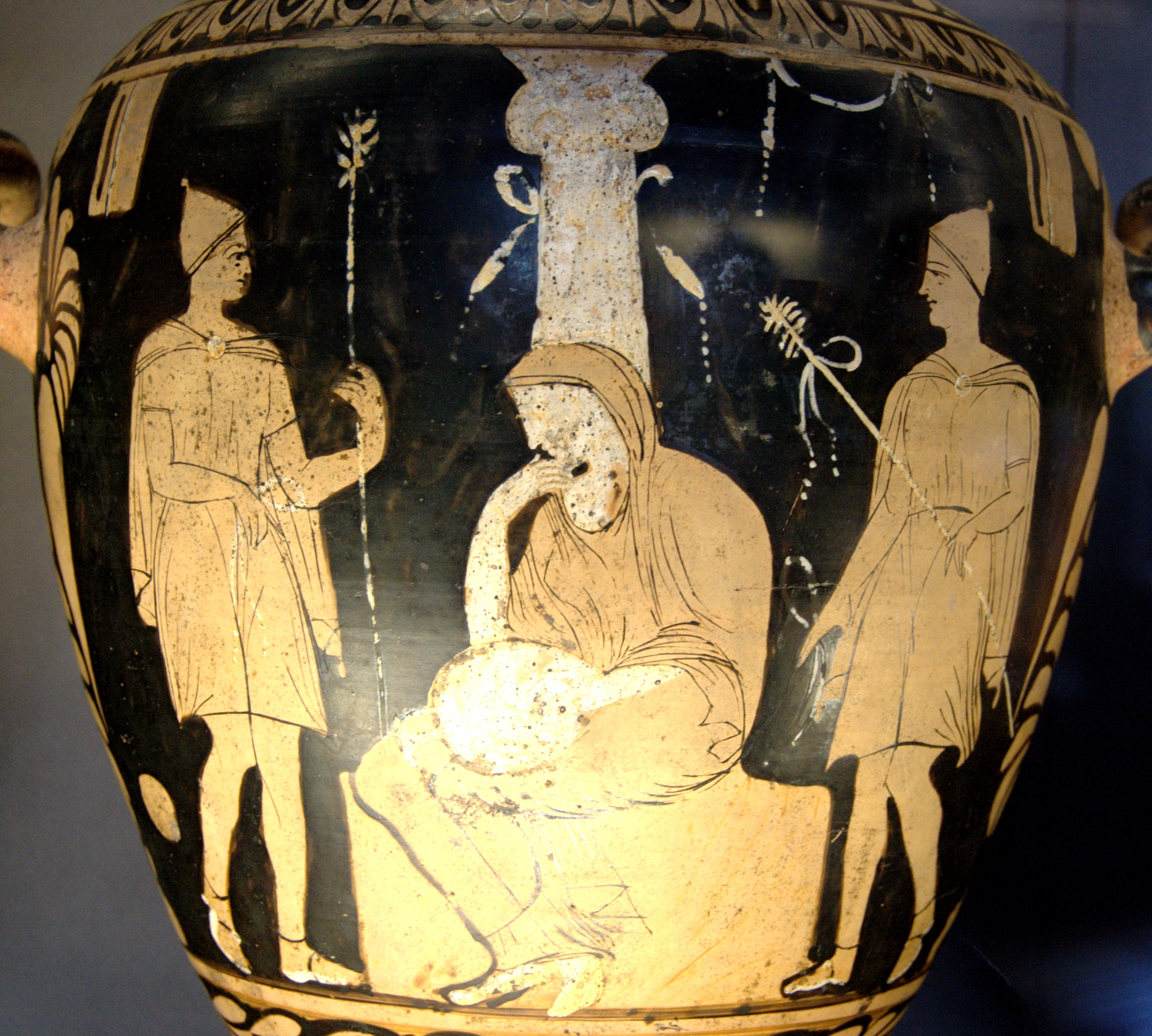
Orestes, Elektra and Pylades in front of the grave of Agamemnon, hydria by the Painter of Louvre K 428, circa 330 BC. Paris: Louvre.

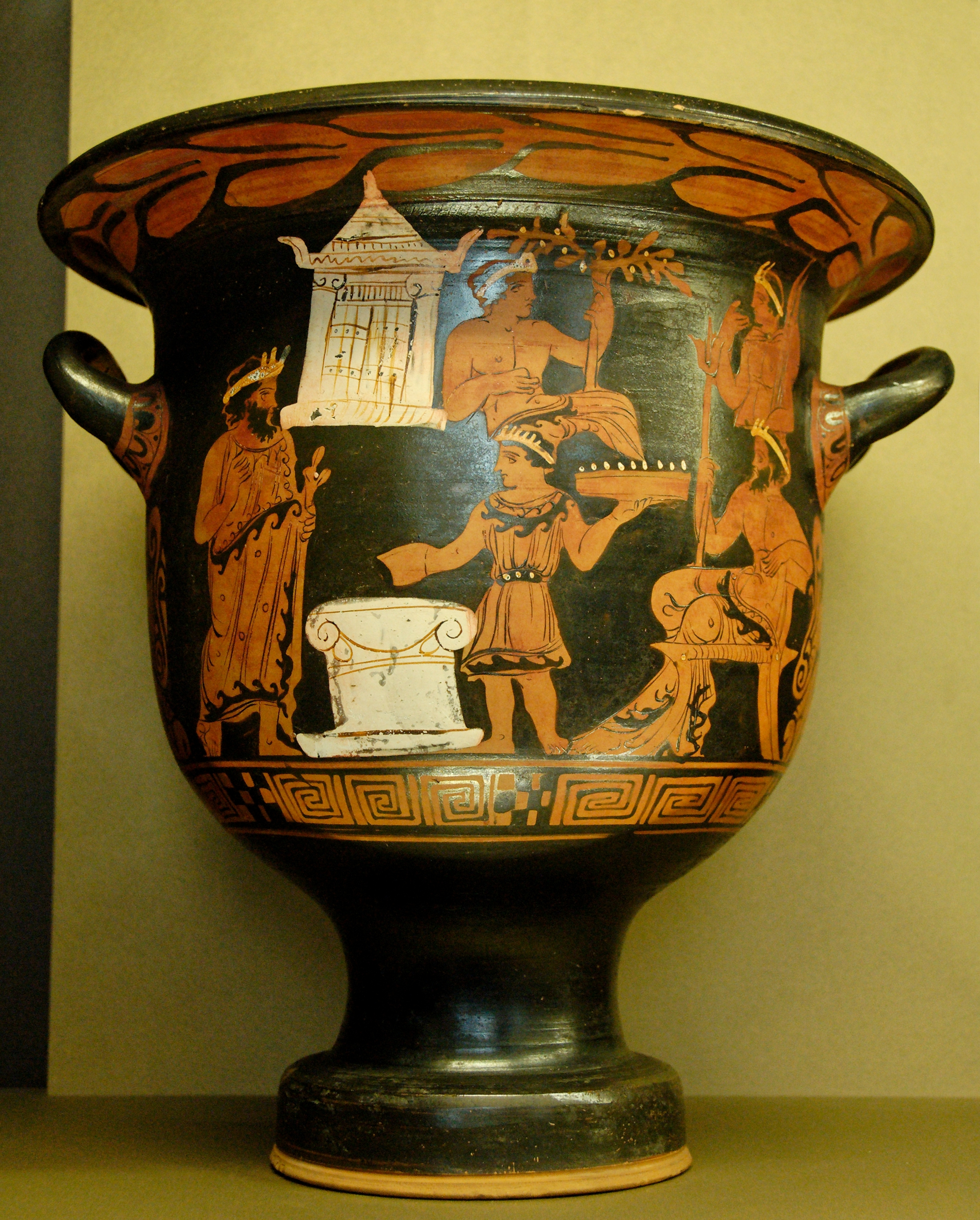
Sacrifice scene on a bell krater by the Painter of the Sacrifice in the Louvre, circa 330/320 BC. Paris: Louvre.

Campanian vase painting is one of the five regional styles of South Italian red-figure vase painting fabricated in Magna Graecia. It forms a close stylistic community with Apulian vase painting.

Campania produced red-figure vases in the 5th and 4th centuries BC. The sand-coloured to light brown clay (lighter than other South Italian clays) of Campania was covered with a slip that developed a pink or red tint after firing, creating an appearance very similar to that of Attic vases. The popular white or bright paints were visually especially striking on this. Women are usually by the use of white paint to depict their skin. The Campanian painters preferred smaller vessel types, but also hydriai and bell kraters. The most popular shape is the bail-amphora. Many typical Apulian vessel shapes, like volute kraters, column kraters, loutrophoroi, rhyta and nestoris amphorae are absent, pelikes are rare. The repertoire of motifs is limited. Subjects include youths, women, thiasos scenes, birds and animals, and often native Samnite warriors. The backs often show cloaked youths. Mythological scenes and depictions related to burial rites play a subsidiary role. Naiskos scenes, ornamental elements and polychromy are adopted after 340 BC under Lucanian influence. The bell-shaped flowers used as ornaments are very different from the ornaments used in other South Italian styles. At 4,000 known vases, the Campanian style is the second most common in the region (after Apulian).

Before the immigration of Sicilian potters in the second quarter of the 4th century BC, when several workshops were established in Campania, only the Owl-Pillar Workshop of the second half of the 5th century is known. It imitated Attic red-figure products. Campanian vase painting is subdivided into three main groups:

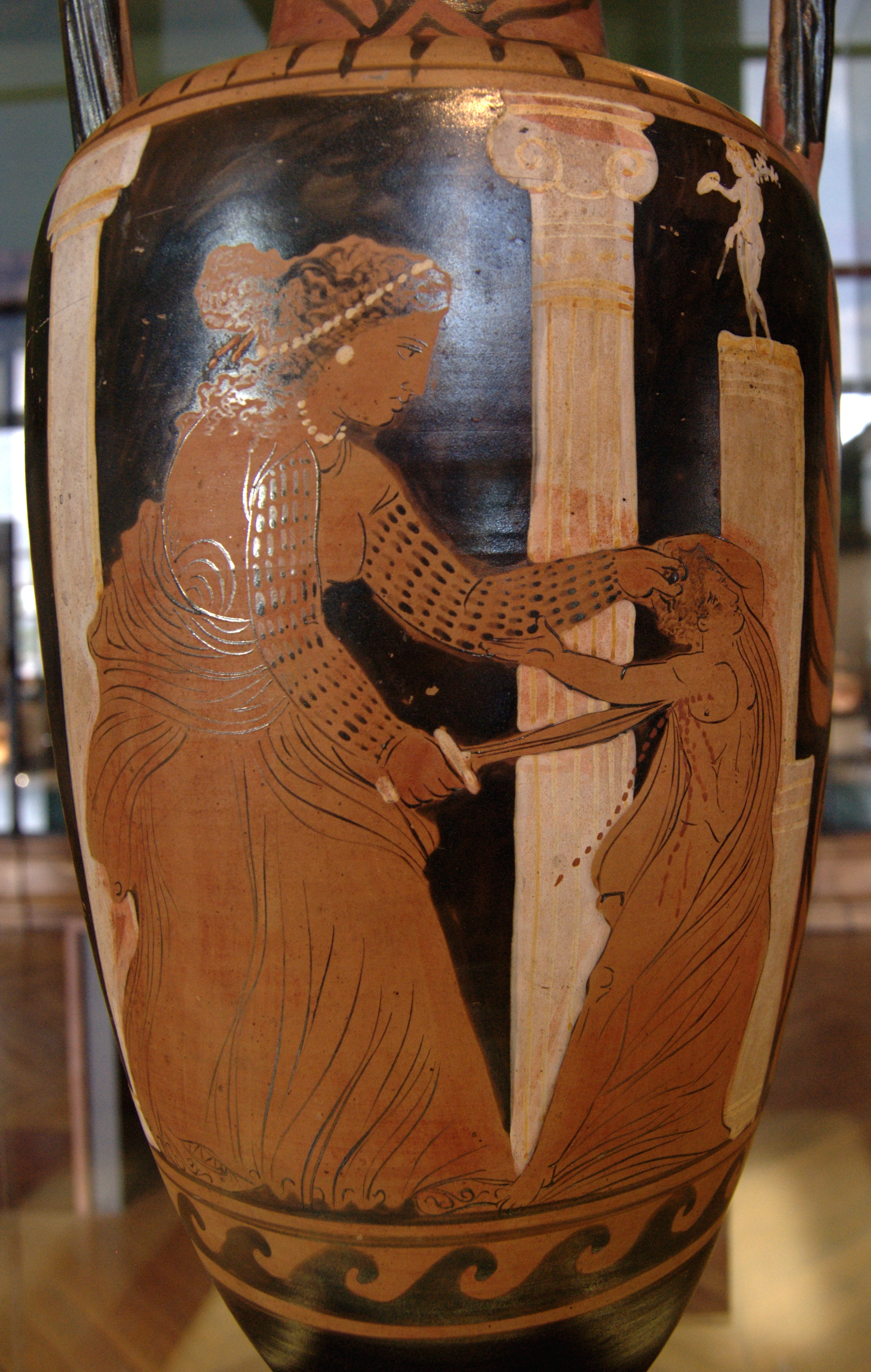
Medea killing one of her children; neck amphora by the Ixion painter, circa 330 BC. Paris: Louvre.

The first group is represented by the Kassandra Painter from Capua, still under Sicilian influence, especially by the Chessboard Painter. He was followed by the workshop of the Parrish Painter and that of the Laghetto Painter and the Caivano Painter, who were influenced by Paestan vase painting. Large vases by these workshops usually bore mythological motifs. Their work is characterised by a preference for satyr figures with thyrsos, depictions of heads (normally below the handles of hydriai), decorative borders of garments, and the frequent use of additional white, red and yellow. The Laghetto and Caivano Painters appear to have moved to Paestum later. The last representative of this manufacture was the Ixion Painter.

The AV Group and the Capua Painter also had their workshop in Capua. This manufacture, too, appears to have been founded by emigrants from Sicily. Of particular importance is the Whiteface-Frignano Painter, one of the first in this group. His typical characteristic is the use of additional white paint to depict the faces of women. This group favoured domestic scenes, women and warriors. Multiple figures are rare, usually there is only one figure each on the front and back of the vase, sometimes only the head. Garments are usually drawn casually.

The workshop in Cumae was founded very late. After 350 BC, its founder, the CA Painter and his collaborators and successors worked there. The CA Painter is considered as the outstanding artist of his group, or even of Campanian vase painting as a whole. From 330 onwards, a strong Apulian influence is visible. The most common motifs are naiskos and grave scenes, dionysiac scenes and symposia. Depictions of bejewelled female heads are also common. The CA painter was polychrome but tended to use much white for architecture and female figures. His successors, the CB Painter and CC Painter were not fully able to maintain his quality, leading to a rapid demise, terminating with the end of Campanian vase painting around 300 BC.

== Bibliography ==
- Thomas Mannack: Griechische Vasenmalerei. Eine Einführung. Theiss, Stuttgart 2002, p. 165f. ISBN 3-8062-1743-2
- Matthias Steinhart: Sizilische Vasen. In: Der Neue Pauly. vol 6, 1998, col. 226-227
- Arthur Dale Trendall: Rotfigurige Vasen aus Unteritalien und Sizilien. Ein Handbuch. von Zabern, Mainz 1991 (Kulturgeschichte der Antiken Welt Vol. 47), ISBN 3-8053-1111-7 (esp. p. 178-222)
