= West Slope Ware =

Ancient Greek ceramics style

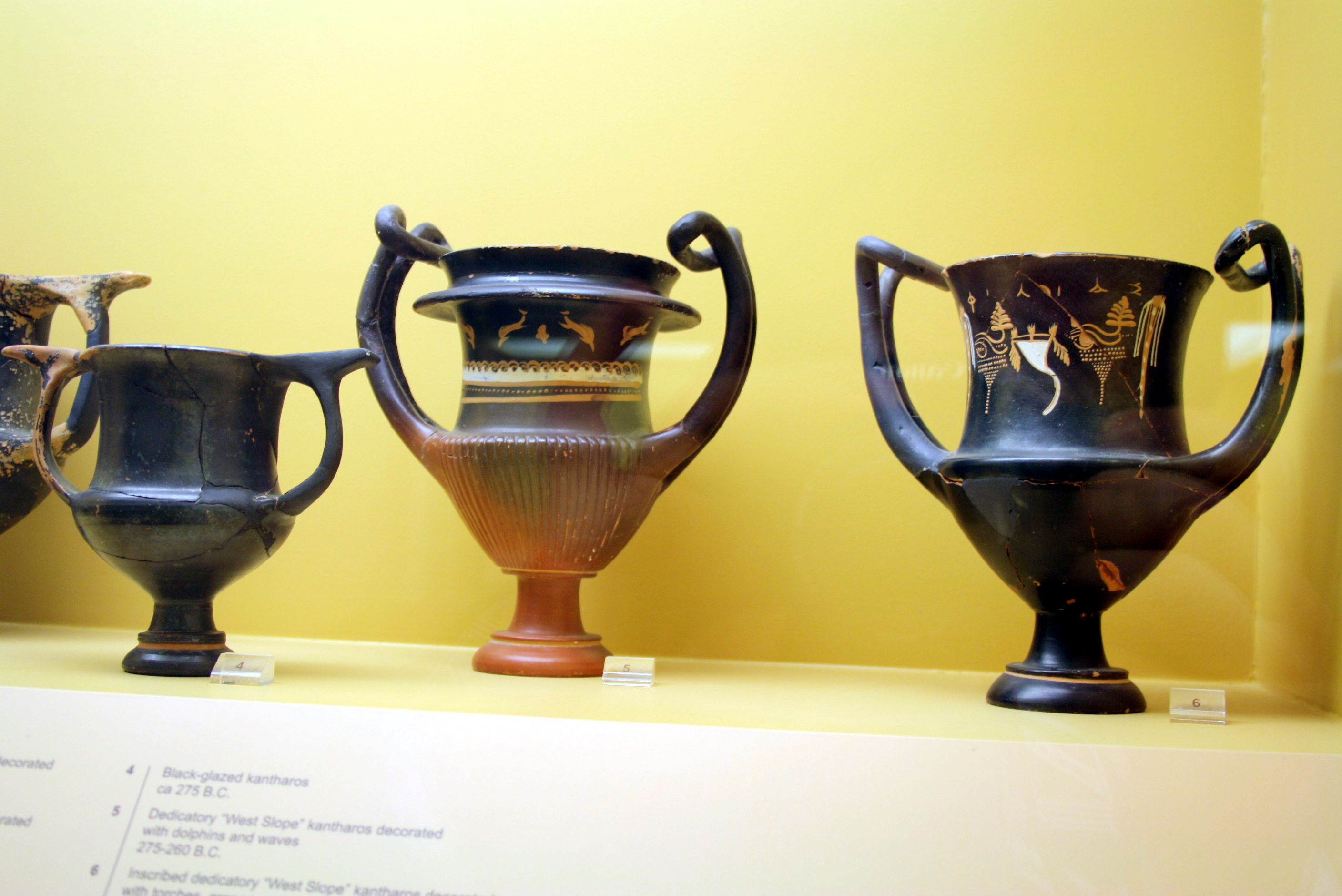
Three Ancient Greek kantharoi vessels in the so-called "West Slope Style", dating from 275 to 260 BC, in the Ancient Agora Museum in Athens

The modern term West Slope pottery describes a type of Greek fine pottery from the Late Classical and Hellenistic periods.

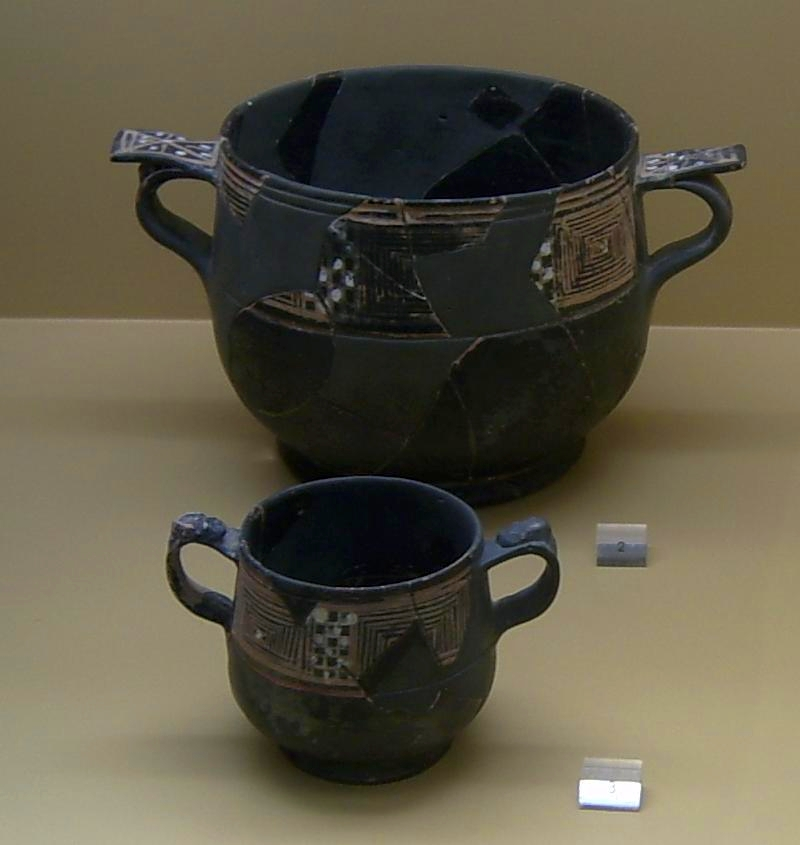
Two kantharoi in the Agora Museum at Athens, circa 225-210 BC.

West Slope pottery was especially widespread in the Eastern Mediterranean region. The name was coined in 1901 by Carl Watzinger, based on finds from the western slope of the Acropolis at Athens. West Slope pottery is a subtype of Black-glazed Ware. It was additionally decorated with white, yellow and pink clay slip, incisions, vertical ribbing and imprinted roulette decoration. The type developed during the 4th century BC out of a pottery style with applied yellowish-orange plastic ornaments that imitated gilding.

West Slope pottery is especially well known from Athens, but several other production centres have been identified. Especially Pergamon is noteworthy in this regard. Since Athens had lost its dominant role in the Mediterranean pottery markets by this time, it should not be assumed that the form is a particularly Attic one, but rather that Athens adopted and went along with a generally prevailing trend in pottery production. The most common vessels shapes included pyxis, krater, hydria, amphora, pelike, jug, krateriskos, kantharos, chalice cup, kylix and lebes.

Similar styles developed in the West Mediterranean. For example, the polychrome Gnathia style is closely related. West Slope pottery underwent several stages of development until it went out of production in the second half of the 2nd century BC.

== Bibliography ==
- Roald F. Docter: Westabhangkeramik. In: Der Neue Pauly, vol. 11, cols. 487–488.
