= Lucanian vase painting =

Substyle of South Italian red-figure vase painting

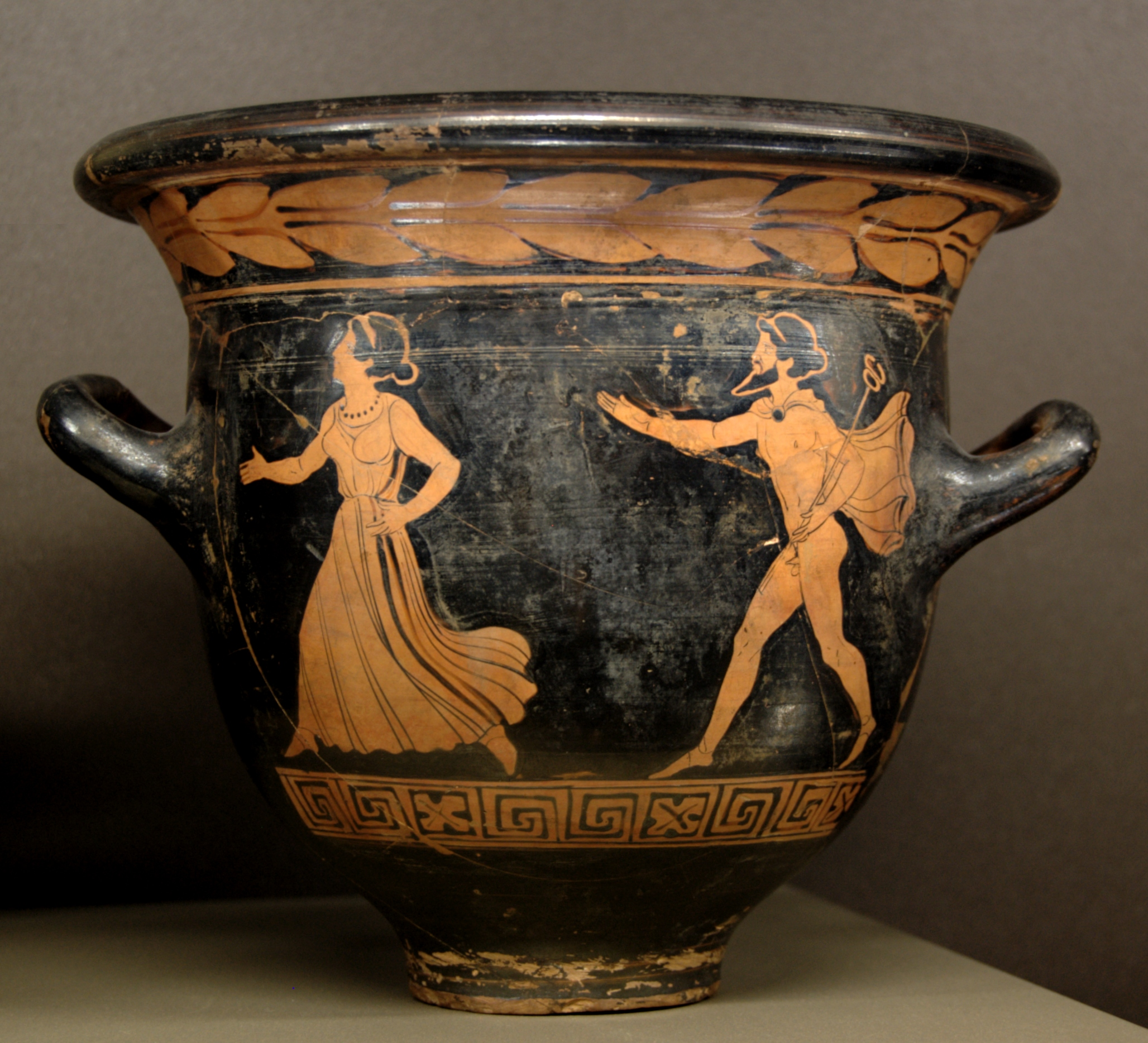
Hermes pursuing a woman, bell krater by the Dolon Painter, circa 390/380 BC. Paris: Louvre.

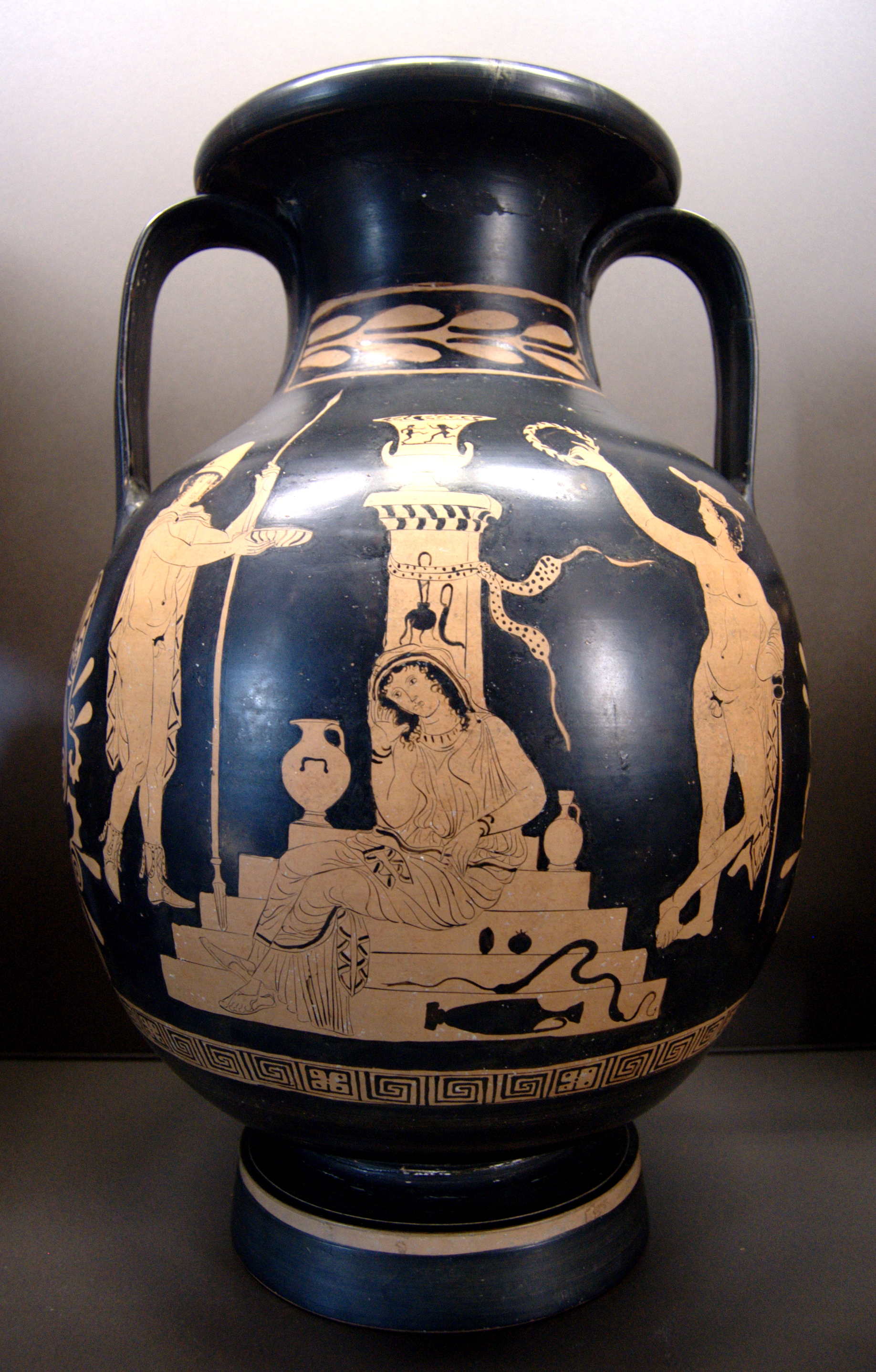
Orestes, Elektra and Hermes in front of the tomb of Agamemnon, pelike by the Choephorai Painter, circa 380/370 BC. Paris: Louvre.

Lucanian vase painting was substyle of South Italian red-figure vase painting fabricated in Magna Graecia, produced in Lucania between 450 and 325 BC. It was the oldest South Italian regional style. Together with Sicilian and Paestan vase painting, it formed a close stylistic community.

The Lucanian vase painting tradition began around 430 BC, with the works of the Pisticci Painter. He was probably active in Pisticci, where some of his works were discovered. He was strongly influenced by Attic tradition. His works rarely depict mythological scenes, probably reflecting the local tastes. Most of them were made as grave offerings. Other early production centres were at Policoro and Metapontum. The Pisticci Painter's successors, the Amykos Painter and the Cyclops Painter had a workshop in Metapontum. In 1973, archaeologists were able to prove the existence of such a workshop by discovering a pottery kiln associated with fragments of vases by the Amykos Painter, the Kreusa Painter and the Dolon Painter. They were the first to paint the new nestoris (see Typology of Greek vase shapes) vase type. Large quantities of Lucanian vases were exported to Apulia. The Dolon Painter may have emigrated there during his career, as his late work reflects an influence by the Apulian Tarporley Painter. Around 370 BC, the workshops in Policoro and Metapontum ceased to function, and production moved to the hinterland. After the mid-4th century, the quality of Lucanian vases deteriorated increasingly, and the range of painted motifs became more and more monotonous. Exports to Apulia also stopped nearly entirely. Around 325 BC, production ceased; the last important representatives of Lucanian vase painting were the Primato Painter (strongly influenced by the Apulian Lycourgos Painter) and the Roccanova Painter. A total of about 1,500 Lucanian vases survive.

In terms of motifs, mythological or theatrical scenes are common. For example, the Cheophoroi Painter, named after the Cheophoroi by Aeschylos showed scenes from the tragedy in question on several of his vases. The influence of Apulian vase painting becomes tangible roughly at the same time. Especially polychromy and vegetal decor became standard.
