= Python (painter) =

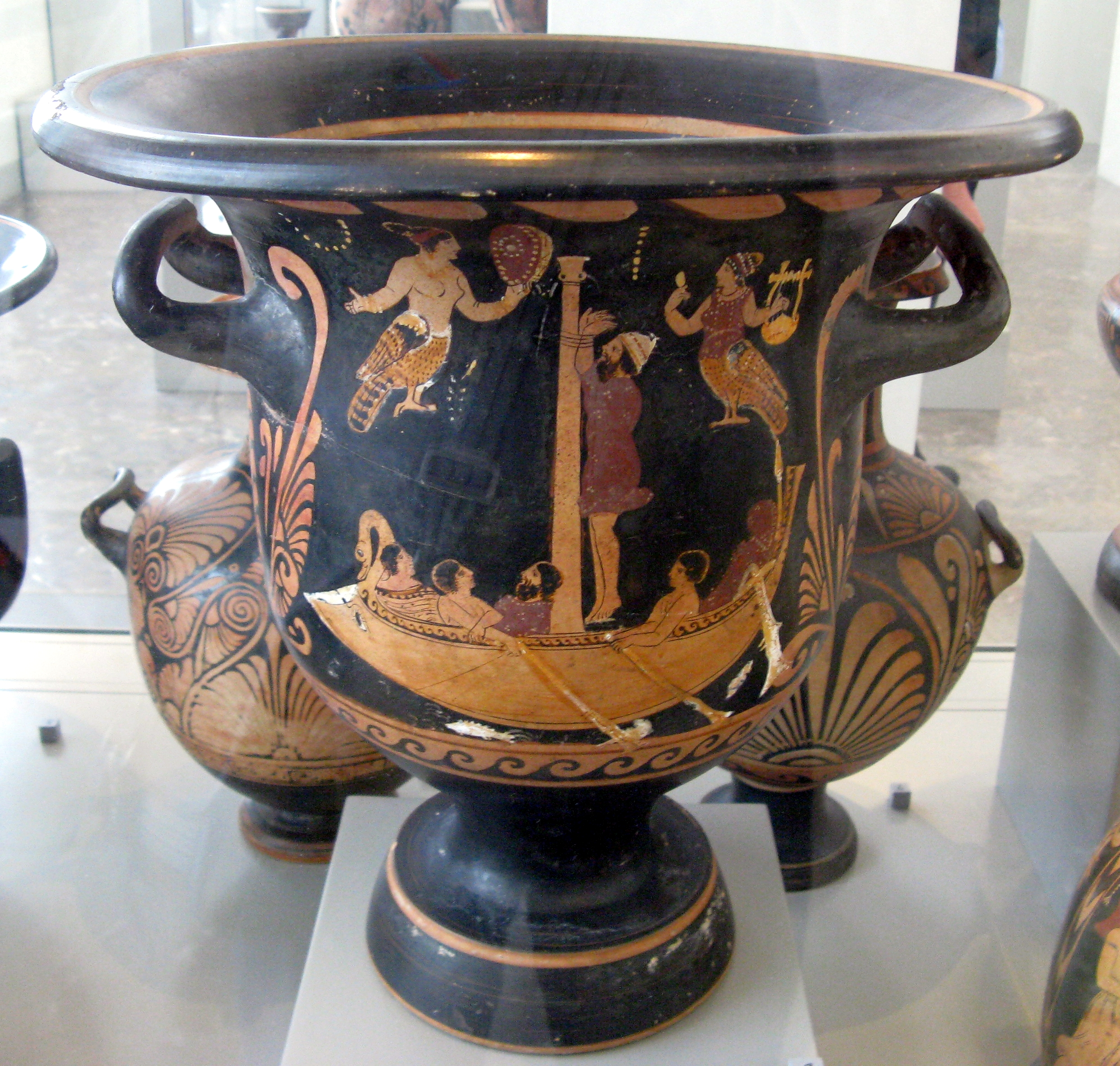
Paestan bell krater by the painter Python: a-site: Odysses with the sirens; from Paestum, ca. 330 BC

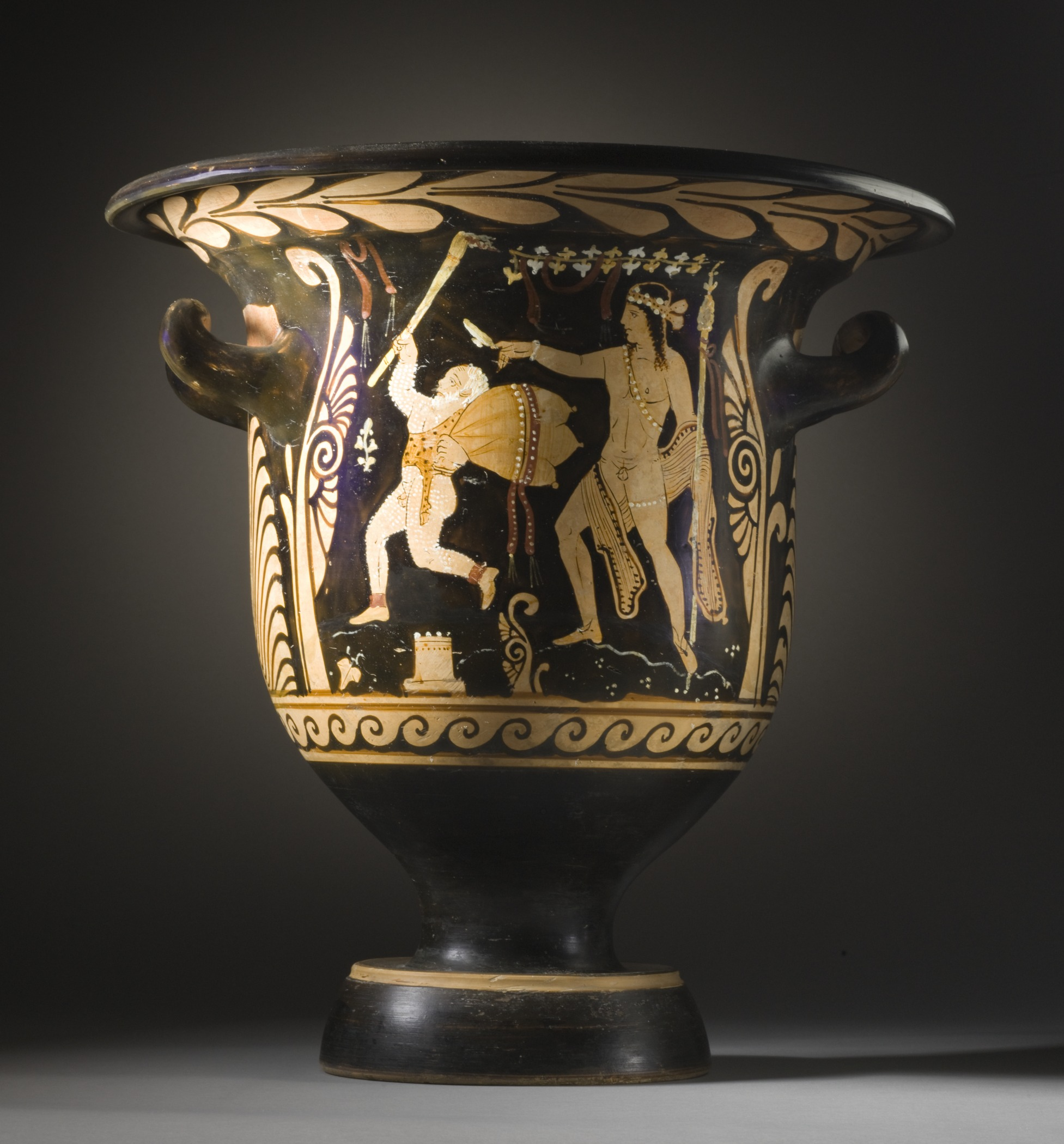
bell-krater with an Elderly Satyr Followed by Young Dionysos

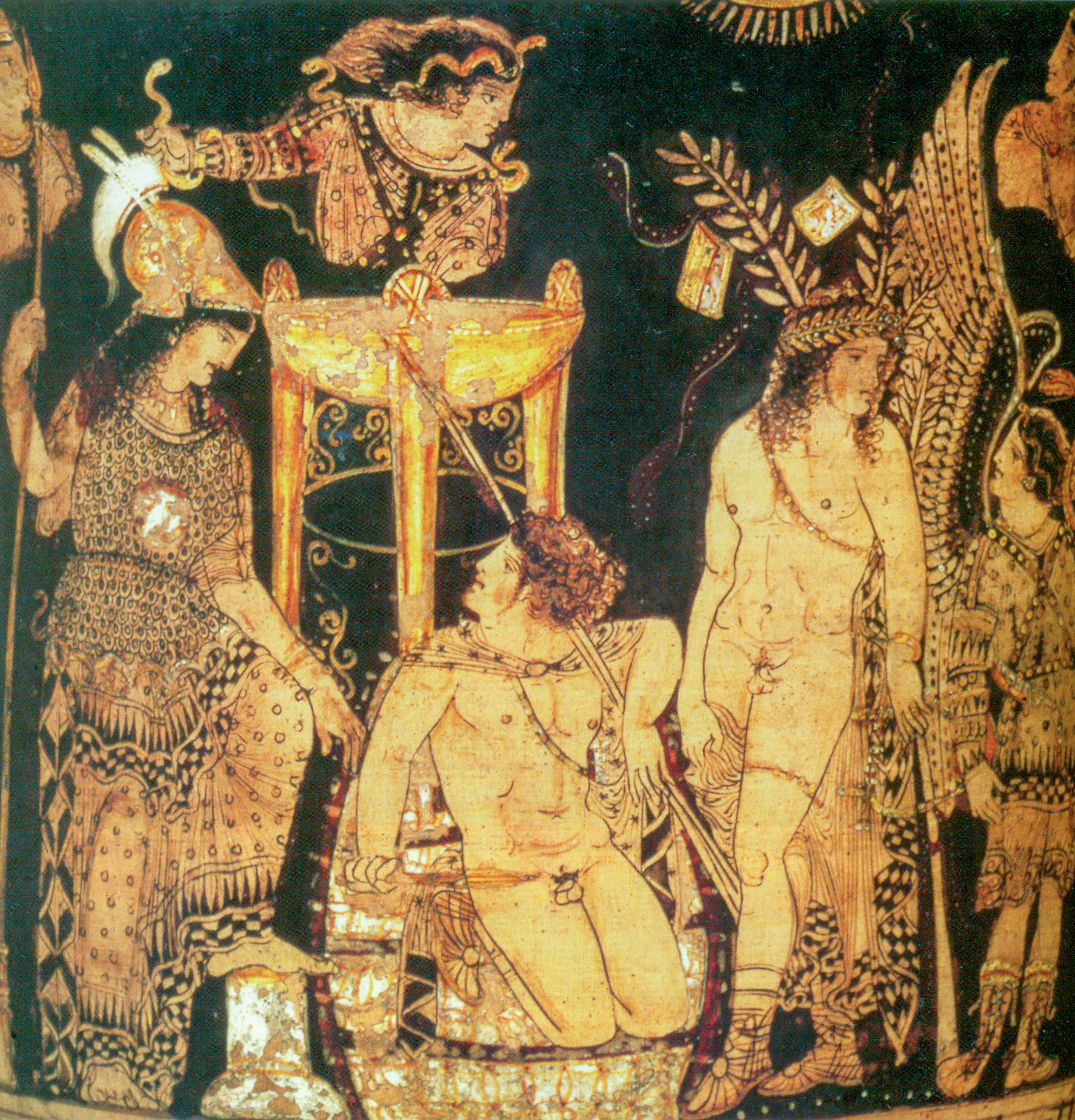
Theatre scene painted by Python, ancient Greek vase painte

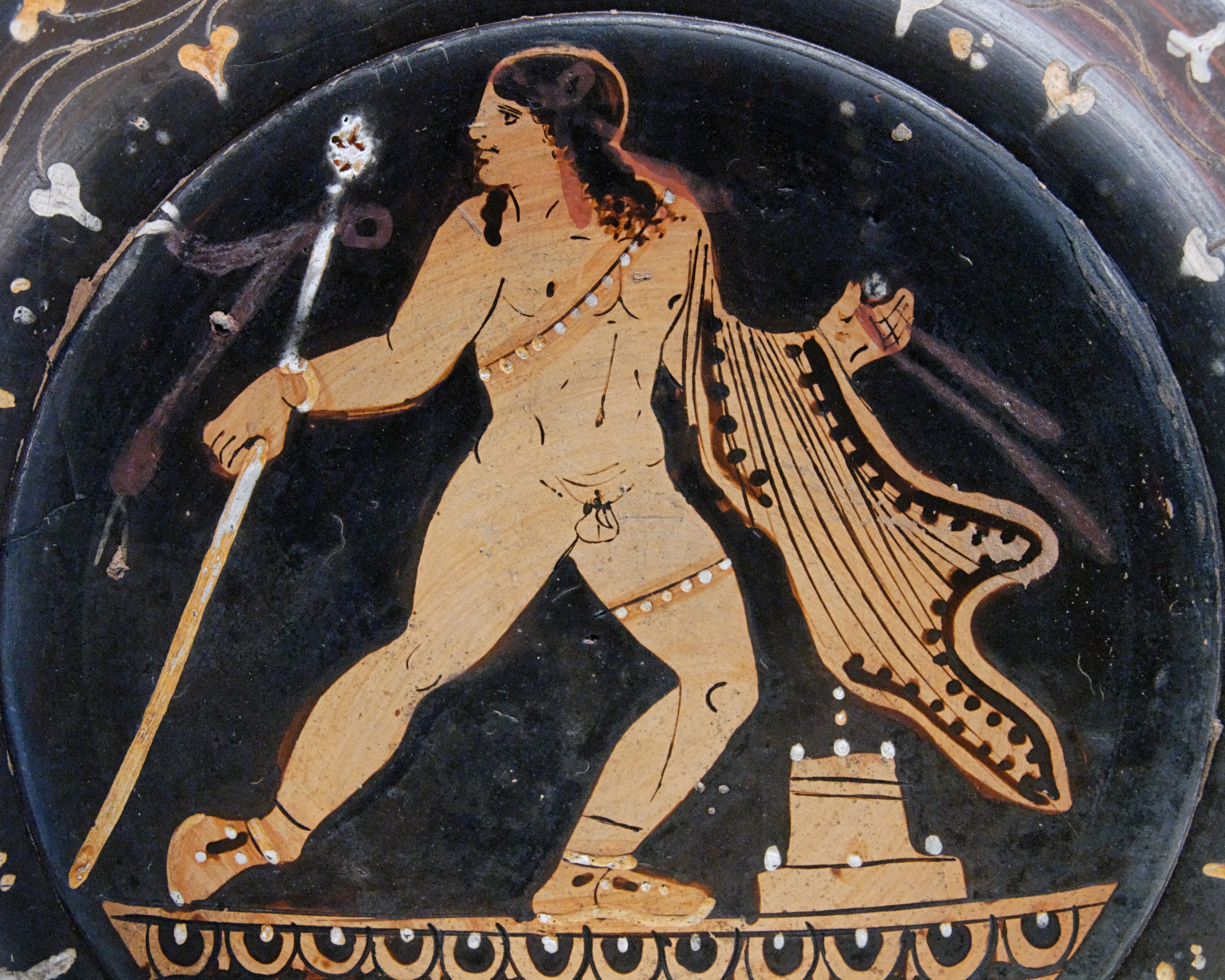
Dionysos Python Louvre

Python (ca. 360-320 BC) was a Greek vase painter in the city of Poseidonia (modern Paestum) in Campania, Southern Italy, one of the major cities of Magna Graecia in the fourth century BC. Together with his close collaborator and likely master Asteas, Python is one of only two vase painters from Southern Italy whose names have survived on extant works. It has even been suggested that the joint workshop of Asteas and Python in Paestum was a family business. (He is not to be confused with the attic vase painter of the early fifth century BC of the same name.)

There are two extant works signed by the Paestan Python:

A bell krater showing Alcmene on the pyre, about to be burned by Amphitryon, being rescued by Zeus, who provided a rainfall that extinguished the flames. Python's signature is in the rim of the obverse face, (with the verb in the contracted form: ΠΥΘΟΝ ΕΓΡΑΦΕ). Reverse: Youthful Dionysus with two dancing maenads and three satyrs watching from a higher level. Its catalogue listing reads, Bell crater, British Museum B.M. number 1890,0210.1, from St. Agata dei Goti. RVP no 2/239 plate 88.

A neck amphora decorated with the birth of Helen from Leda's egg that bears Python's signature in the altar base. Its catalogue listing reads, ΠΥΘΟΝ ΕΓΡΑΦΕ); Reverse: Dionysian scene (seated Dionysus with young satyr and maenad). Neck amphora, Paestum 21370, from Paestum. RVP no 2/240 plate 89.

Stylistic similarities with the signed works allow the association of Python and his workshop with a large number of smaller vessels and a sizeable number of bell kraters, amphorae, lebetes gamikoi see lebes, lekythoi, and a few calyx-kraters that have been discovered. One of these, an unsigned bell krater thought to be by Python has been seized in Manhattan by police who suspect that it was looted from a grave site in Southern Italy. It had been displayed by the Metropolitan Museum of Art in its Greco-Roman galleries for many years. Return to Italy is likely.

Python's works are all in the red-figure style and are painted on clay with rich orange-brown colour and a high content of very small mica particles. His style is somewhat more heavy-handed than that of Asteas and, especially, on the smaller vessels, strongly stereotyped. He favoured the use of multi-coloured added decoration in white, yellow, black, and red. His figures sometimes seem stiff, with round and large heads and thick limbs, failing to be comparable to the more elegant style of Asteas. The decoration on the larger pieces by Python tends to be dense. The edges of draped garments on his figures are almost uniformly lined with the typical Paestan dot-line pattern that evolved in the Asteas-Python workshop. Seated figures in side-view show a recurrent pose identical for both male and female figures, with one leg posed slightly before the other. Also typical of Python's style, is the posture of seated figures on scrolls or vines, or standing figures resting one foot on a scroll. This characteristic has been continued by the painter of Naples 2585, likely the last successor of Python's workshop. The main faces of the larger pieces are framed by palmettes, with double palmettes on larger pieces and more simple, single palmettes on smaller pieces.

Apart from mythological scenes on his larger works, many works contain Dionysian scenes with the youthful Dionysus, almost always with curly hair falling above his shoulders, wearing an ivy wreath, carrying a thyrsus, and watching or joining maenads and satyrs in their pursuits (see backs of the two signed vessels) .

Among Python's most appealing pieces are phlyax vases with depictions of the Greek comedies, played at the time in the colonies of Magna Graecia. Several pieces also show Dionysus or maenads holding theatrical masks, with the theatre an activity closely linked to Dionysus.

The link to Dionysus is significant, as almost all of Python's works were found in the chamber tombs in and around Paestum, with the Dionysian theme of the youthful god giving immortality to those he loves (see Ariadne and Dionysus) to be seen in context with the hope of a happy afterlife <JPS>.
