= Pisticci Painter =

Italian vase painter

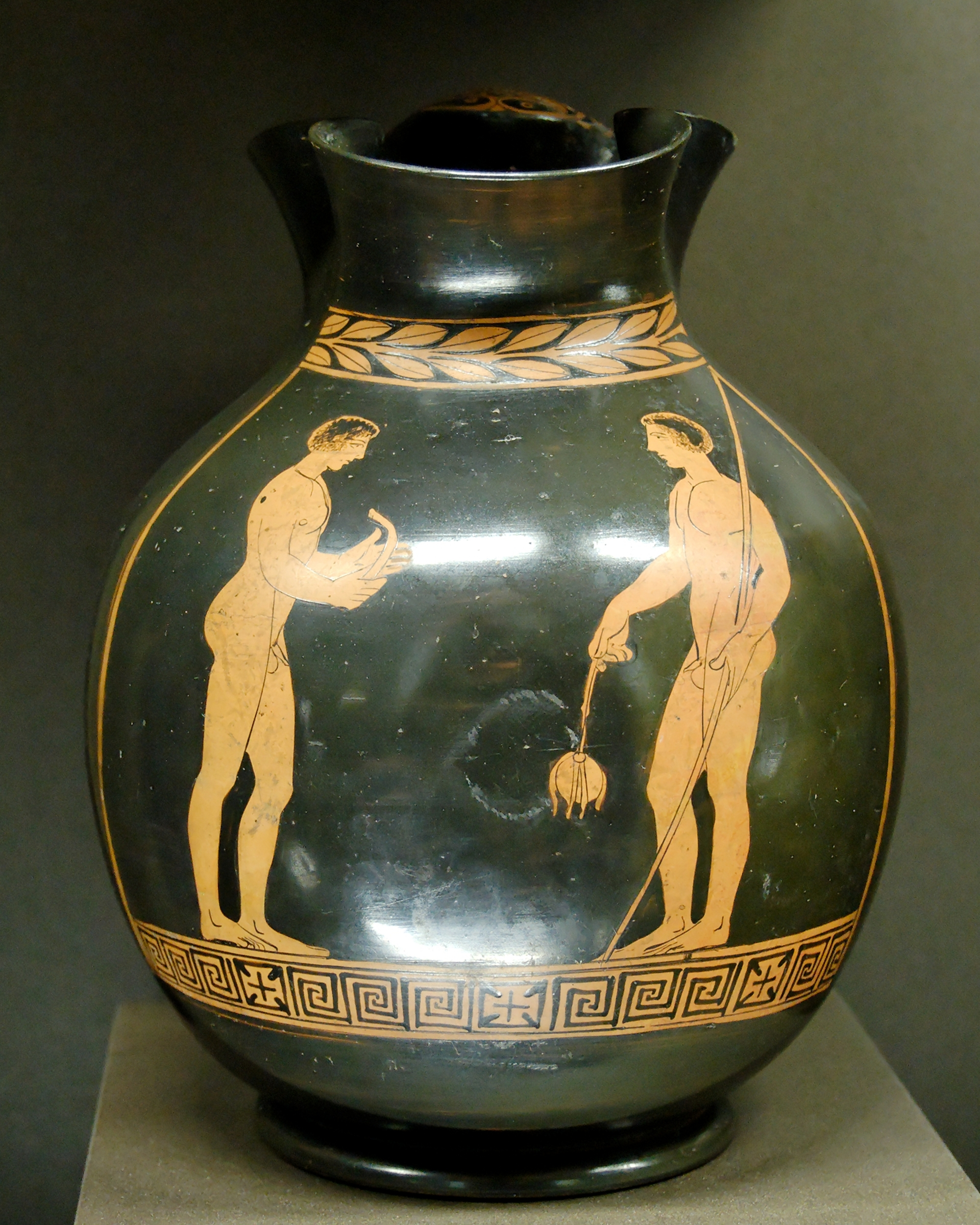
Lucanian red-figure oenochoe depicting two athletes, attributed to the Pisticci Painter: from Metapontum, c. 430–420 BC.

The Pisticci Painter was a vase painter who lived in the second half of the 5th century BC. Many of his artistic works were discovered in Pisticci, a small town a few kilometers from Metaponto, Lucania, Italy.

Ceramics of typically Attic taste began to be produced in the colonies of Magna Graecia toward the end of the 5th century BC. It is thought that the founders of those workshops were vase painters trained and educated in Attica. The political instability of the time in Athens very likely determined the migrations of those painters to the Magna Graecia colonies. Since the work of the Pisticci Painter can be related on the basis of stylistic characteristics to the school of Polygnotus, it may be supposed that he trained in Athens with that artist.

The Pisticci Painter is considered the father of the Lucanian workshop, which is the oldest of the Italiot workshops (the beginning of its activity is placed between 440 and 430 BC). The Pisticci Painter would therefore be the first master of red-figure pottery to have worked in Italy. His workshop also included other vase painters including the Cyclops Painter, the Amycus Painter, and the "PKP group" (the Palermo Painter, the Carnea Painter and the Policoro Painter). The discovery alongside the northern walls of the city of Metapontum of kiln waste containing fragments of vases decorated by other painters who belonged to the Lucanian workshop suggests that the Pisticci Painter operated in this important Achaean colony.

The Pisticci Painter's depictions show an exquisitely Attic taste in both the choice of themes and the techniques employed. The scenes he most commonly painted are pursuit scenes (Eros pursuing female or male figures, Eos pursuing Kephalos or Tithonos, Boreas pursuing Orithyia), Dyonisiac scenes with maenads and satyrs, scenes of the departure of warriors, athletes, oblations near herms, and mythological scenes (Pandora, Io, Zeus and Aegina, Polynices and Eriphyle, the Laocoön).

The works of this artist are included in the most prestigious collections of the world (the British Museum, the Louvre, the Hermitage, the Museum of Fine Arts in Boston, the Metropolitan Museum, the National Archeological Museum in Naples, and the Vatican Museums).
