= Paestan vase painting =

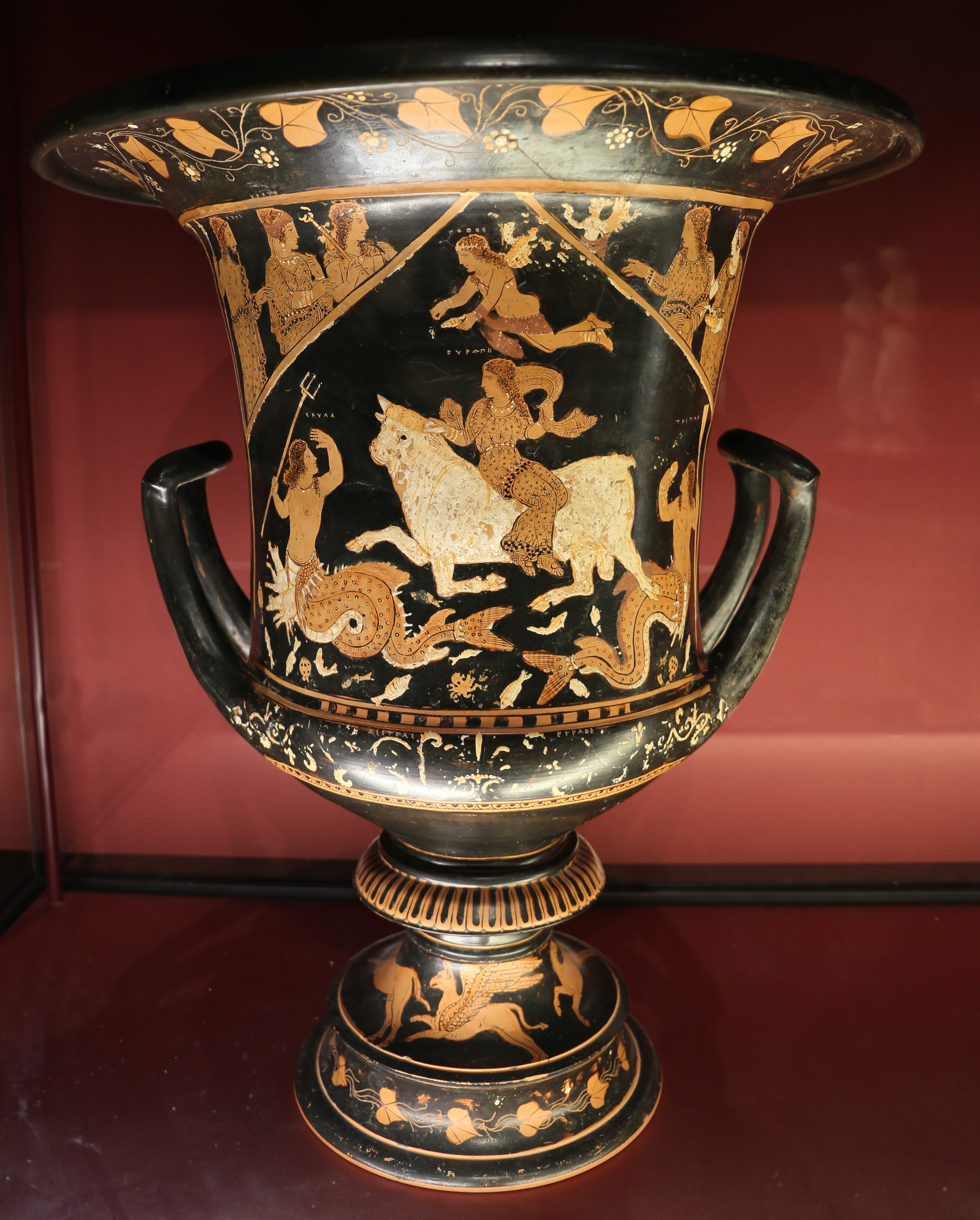
The Rape of Europa, Asteas krater from Saticula

Paestan vase painting was a style of vase painting associated with Paestum, a city in South Italy founded by Greek colonists of Magna Graecia. Paestan vase painting is one of five regional styles of South Italian red-figure vase painting.

== Development ==
The Paestan vase painting style was originated by Sicilian immigrants around 360 BC, and was the last of the South Italian styles to develop. The first workshop was controlled by Asteas and Python, who are the only South Italian vase painters known from inscriptions. They mainly painted bell kraters, neck amphorae, hydriai, lebes gamikos, lekanes, lekythoi and jugs, more rarely pelikes, chalice kraters, and volute kraters.

Asteas and Python had a major influence on the vase painting of Paestum, clearly visible in the work of the Aphrodite Painter, a likely immigrant from Apulia. Around 330 BC, a second workshop developed, based on the work of the first. The quality of its painting and variety of its motifs deteriorated quickly. At the same time, an influence by the Campanian Caivano Painter becomes notable, with garments falling in a linear fashion and contourless female figures. Around 300 BC, Paestan vase painting came to a halt.

== Motifs and themes ==
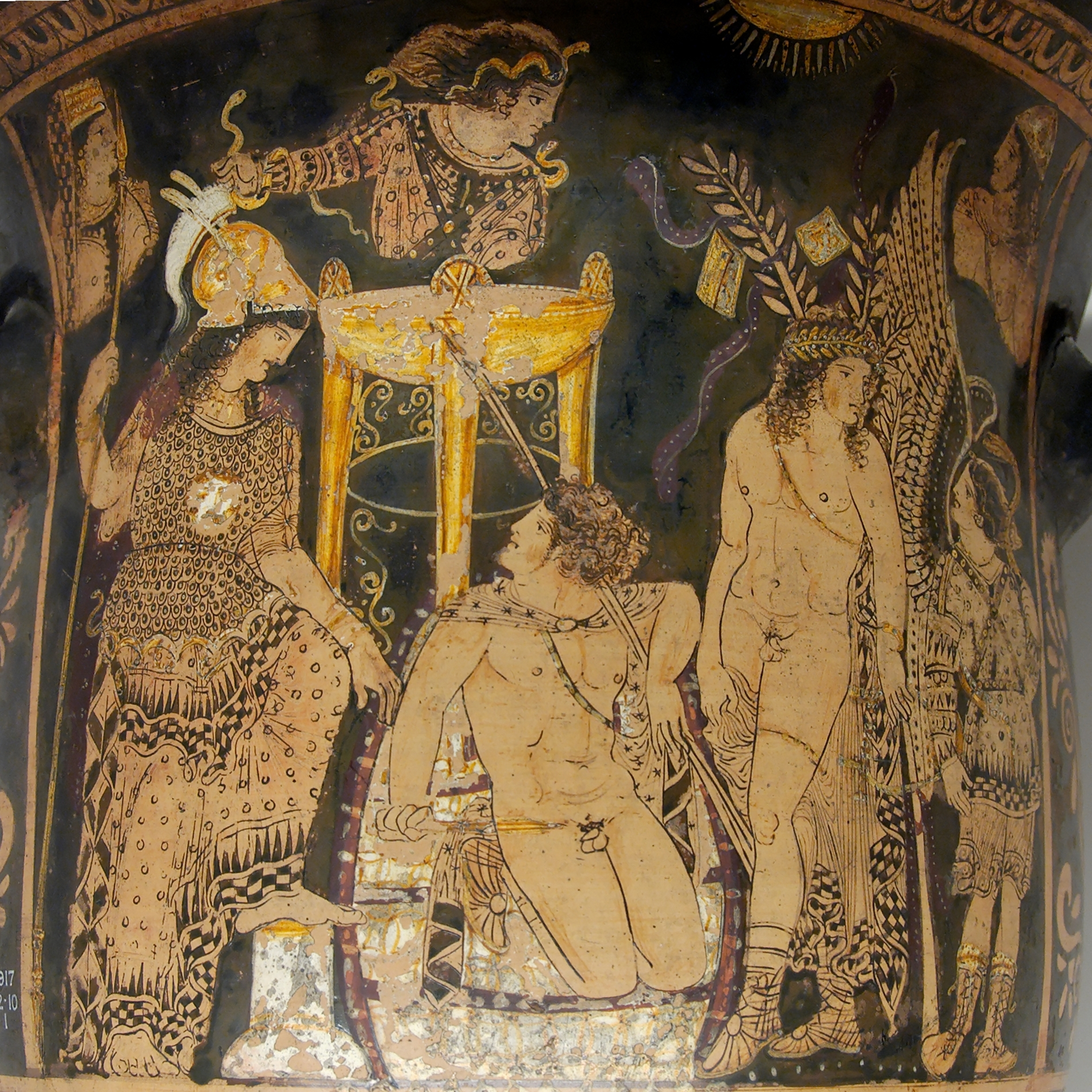
Orestes in Delphi, krater by Python, ca. 330 BC (British Museum, London)

Characteristics of the Paestan style include decorations such as lateral palmettes, a pattern of tendrils with calyx and umbel known as "Asteas flower", crenelation-like patterns on garments, and curly hair hanging over the back of figures. Figures that bend forwards, resting on plants or rocks, are equally common. Special colours are used often, especially white, gold, black, purple and shades of red.

The themes depicted often belong to the Dionysiac cycle: thiasos and symposium scenes, satyrs, maenads, Silenos, Orestes, Electra, the gods Aphrodite and Eros, Apollo, Athena and Hermes. Paestan painting rarely depicts domestic scenes, but favours animals.

== Bibliography ==
- Arthur Trendall: The red-figured vases of Paestum. Rom 1987.
- Arthur Trendall: Rotfigurige Vasen aus Unteritalien und Sizilien. Ein Handbuch. von Zabern, Mainz 1991 (Kulturgeschichte der Antiken Welt Vol. 47), ISBN 3-8053-1111-7 (esp. p. 223-264)
- Rolf Hurschmann: Paestanische Vasenmalerei. In: Der Neue Pauly, vol 9, 2000, cols. 142-143
- Thomas Mannack: Griechische Vasenmalerei. Eine Einführung. Theiss, Stuttgart 2002, S. 166f. ISBN 3-8062-1743-2
