= Asteas =

4th-century BC Greek (Paestan) Vase painter

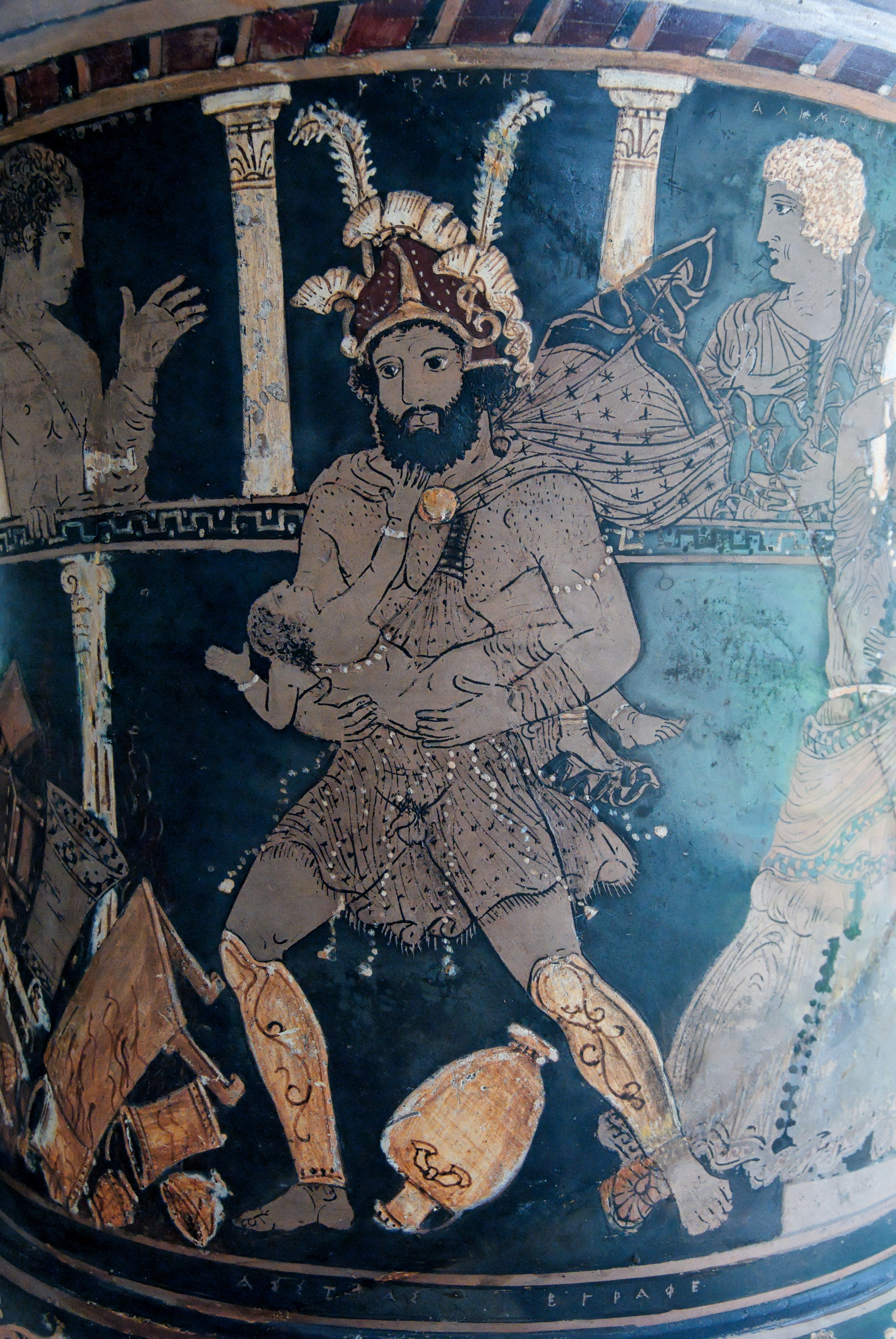
The madness of Heracles, side A from the Madrid Krater signed by Asteas, National Archaeological Museum of Spain

Asteas (active between 350 and 320 BC in Paestum, Southern Italy) was one of the more active ancient Greek vase painters in Magna Graecia, practicing the red-figure style. He managed a large workshop, in which above all hydriai and kraters were painted. He painted mostly mythological and theatrical scenes. He is one of the few vase painters of the Greek colonies whose name comes down to us.

== Selected works ==
Berlin, Antikensammlung

Calyx krater F 3044

Kassel, Staatliche Museen

Skyphos

Montesarchio, Museo Archeologico Nazionale del Sannio Caudino

Calyx krater. Formerly in the collection of the J. Paul Getty Museum (81.AE.78), the vase was returned to Italy in 2005 after Italian officials provided evidence that it had been illegally looted. The vase shows the abduction of Europa on one side, and a Dionysias Thiasus on the other.

Naples, Museo archeologico nazionale di Napoli

Paestan Squat lekythos 81847 (H. 2873). The vase shows five Hesperides (labelled Aiopis, Antheia, Kalypso, Mrmesa, and Nelisa) along with Heracles, Pan, Hermes, possibly Hera, and a woman labelled Donakis.

Paris, Musée National du Louvre

Lekanis K 570

Tampa, Tampa Museum of Art

Hydria 89.98

== Bibliography ==
- Felch, Jason (10 November 2005). "The Getty Returns 3 Ancient Artifacts to Italy". Los Angeles Times.
- McPhee, Ian (1990). "Hesperides". Lexicon Iconographicum Mythologiae Classicae. Vol. V.1. Artemis. pp. 394–406.
- Trendall, Arthur Dale. The red-figured vases of Paestum. Rome: British School, 1987.
- Simon, Erika. Ein neuer signierter Kelchkrater des Asteas. In: Numismatica e antichità classiche. Quaderni ticinesi 31 (2002) 115-127.
- Simon, Erika. The Paestan painter Asteas. In: Greek vases. Images, contexts and controversies. Proceedings of the conference sponsored by the Center for the Ancient Mediterranean at Columbia University, 23–24 March 2002 (Leiden 2004), p. 113-122.
