= Amykos Painter =

Ancient Lucanean-Greek vase-painter

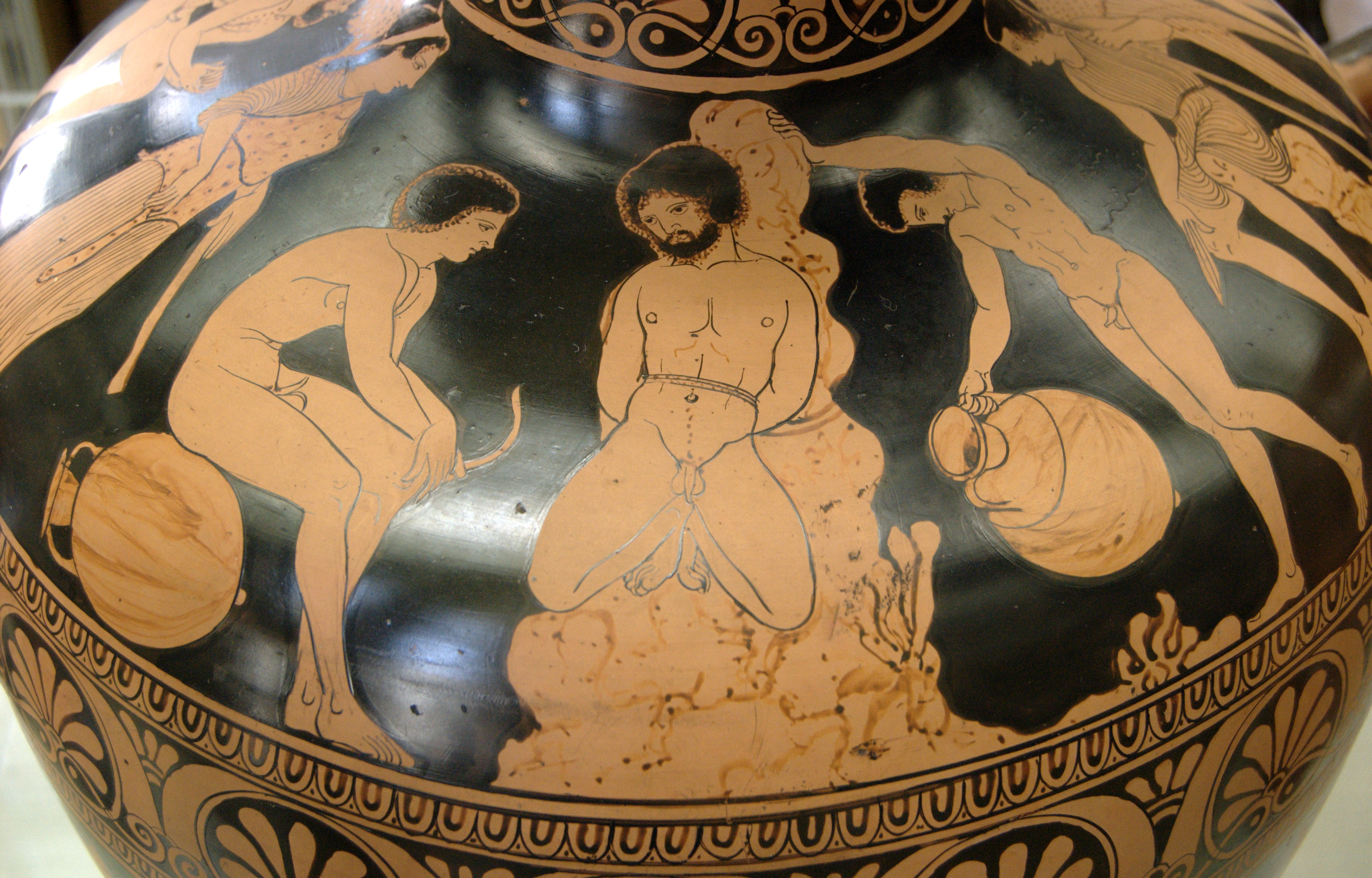
- Amykos bound by the Argonauts by the Amykos Painter, dated to within 425–400 BC. Located in the Cabinet des Médailles Museum, Paris, Main floor, 2nd room
- Known for: Vase painting
- Movement: Red-figure pottery

The Amykos Painter (active around 430–400 BC in Lucania) was the name given to a South Italian vase painter who worked in the ancient Greek red-figure pottery technique. His exact date of birth and death are unknown.

As with any of the artisans working during the (late) fifth century BC, very little is understood about the Amykos Painter's life. It is generally agreed by scholars that the Amykos Painter learned his trade in Athens. He owes his name to a depiction on a Lucanian hydria depicting Amykos, who was the featured subject in one of his surviving works which currently resides at the Cabinet des Médailles, Paris. Among countless other vases, there is also a red-figure bell-krater depicting Silenus and two maenads which has been attributed to him.

== See also ==
- Corpus vasorum antiquorum
