= Hydria =

Type of Greek pottery used for carrying water

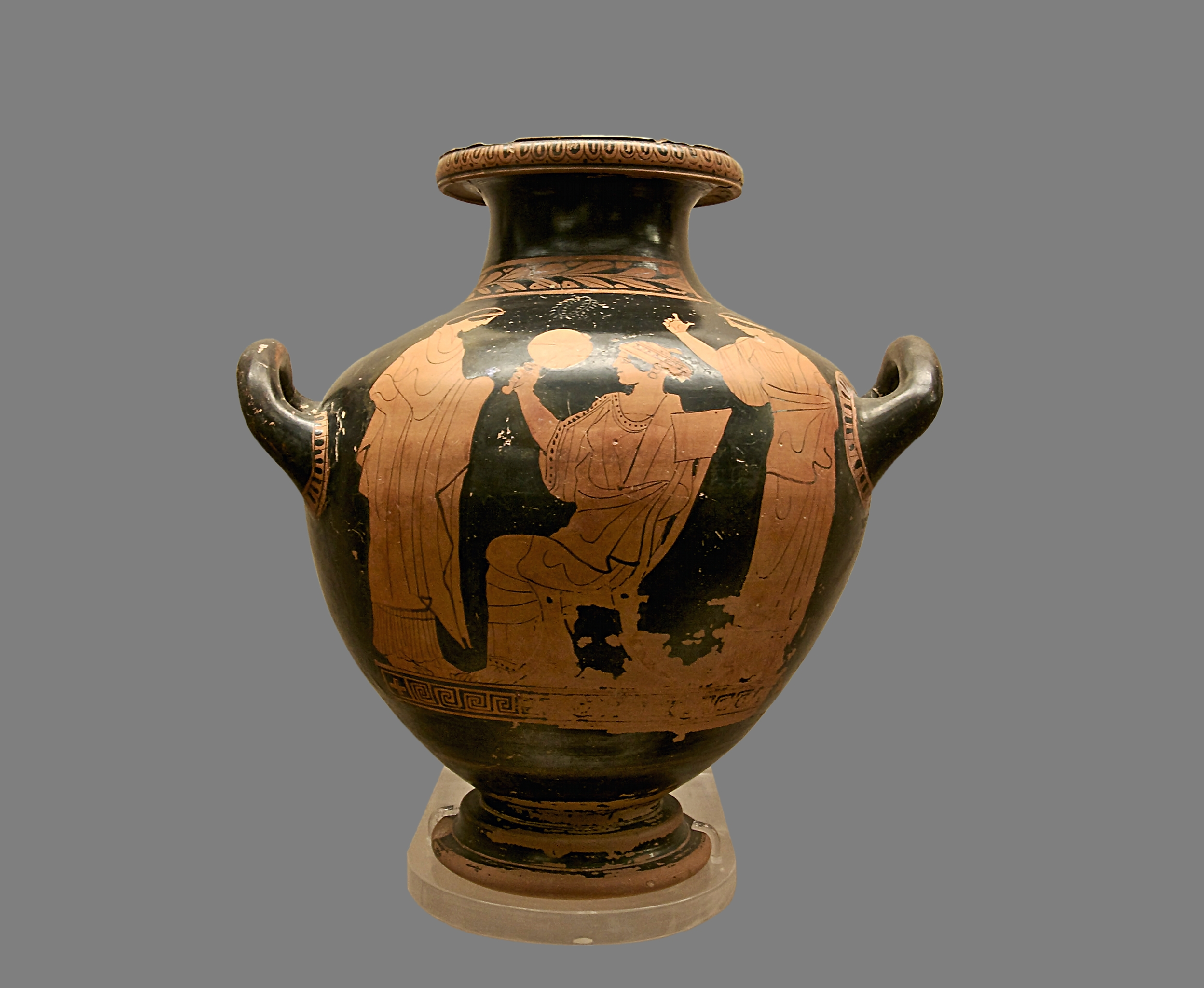
- A hydria, c. 470–450 BC
- Material: Ceramic and bronze
- Size: Medium-volume container varying from 25cm to 50 cm, able to be carried by one or more people.
- Writing: Painters would sometimes inscribe their name onto the hydria.
- Symbols: Mythological stories were often painted onto the hydria, as well as scenes of daily life, such as the collection of water.
- Created: Geometric period, archaic period, classical period Hellenistic period
- Discovered: 19th century
- Culture: Ancient Greek

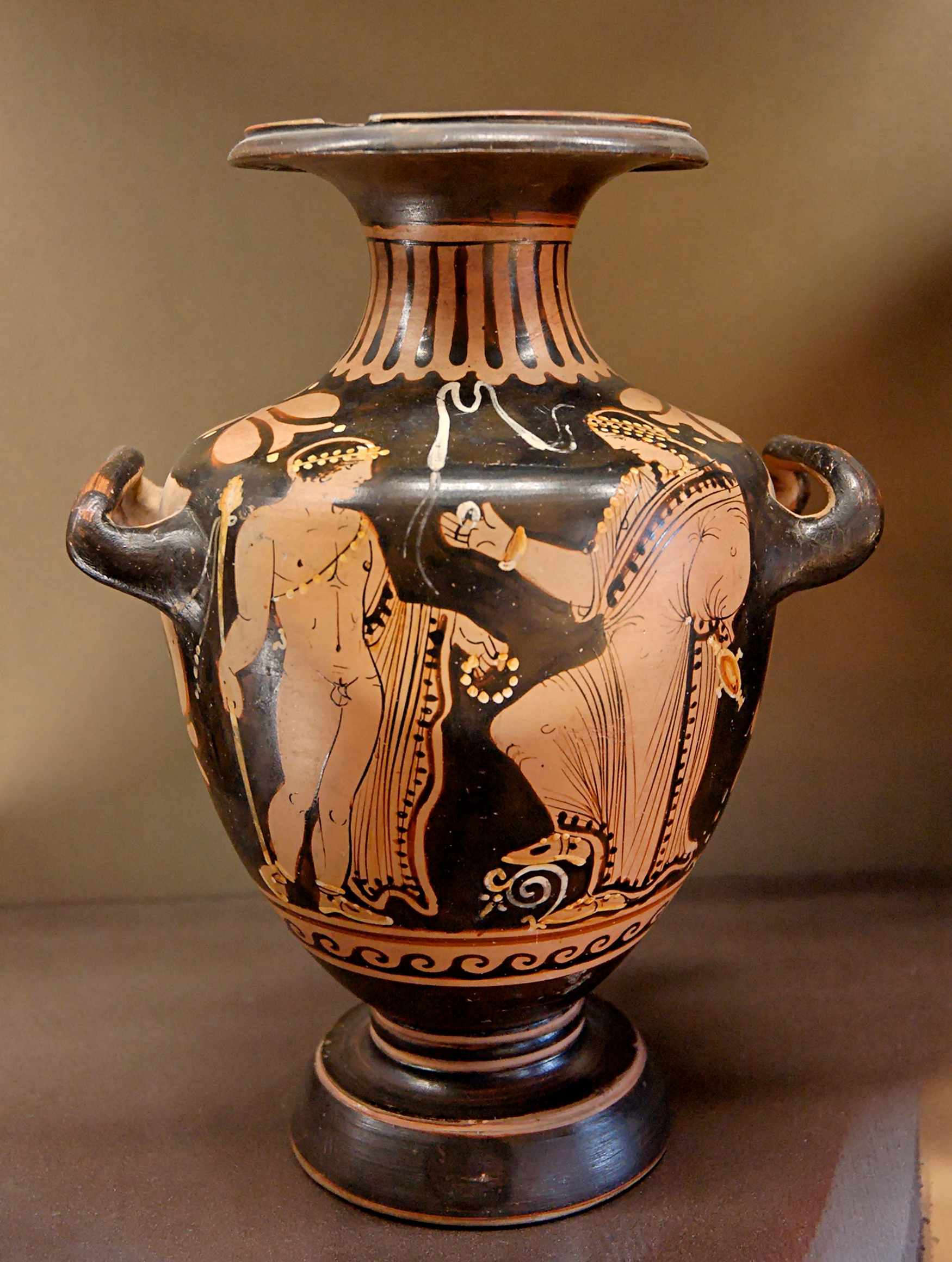
Red-figure hydria, c. 360–350 BC, from Paestum; the vertical handle used for pouring is located on the opposite side (Department of Greek, Etruscan and Roman Antiquities, Louvre).

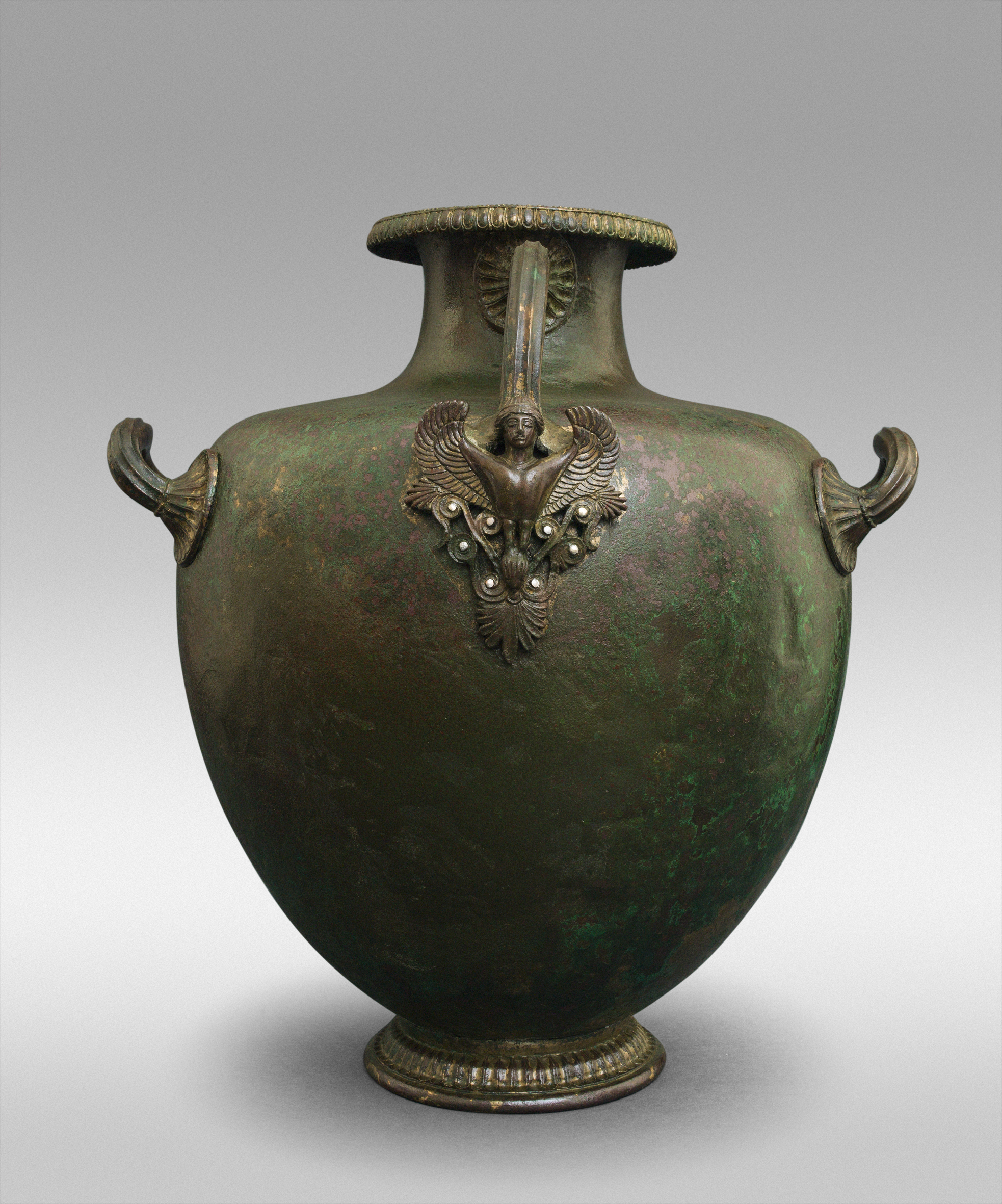
Bronze hydria / kalpis with siren handle attachment, c. 460–450 BC, housed in the Vassil Bojkov Collection, Sofia, Bulgaria

The hydria (Greek: ὑδρία; pl.: hydriai) is a form of Greek pottery from between the late Geometric period (7th century BC) and the Hellenistic period (3rd century BC). The etymology of the word hydria was first noted when it was stamped on a hydria itself, its direct translation meaning 'jug'.

It is a type of water-carrying vessel, but it had many other purposes. As time progressed the hydria developed into many forms, some of which were smaller or of a different material. These variants were decorated with detailed figures to represent Greek mythological stories, as well as scenes of daily life, providing extensive insight into Ancient Greek culture and society.

== Function ==
Originally, the hydria's purpose was for the collection of water, but it also held oil and the votes of judges. The design of the hydria allowed for the efficient collecting and pouring of liquids as it possessed three handles: two horizontal ones at its sides and a vertical one on its back. The shape of the hydria was altered in the 5th century BC from having a wide body and broadly rounded shoulders, to a design that incorporated flatter shoulders that met the body at an angle. This was done to ease the task of carrying water to and from the home and places of gathering. The vessel itself could be carried, and the vertical handle allowed the person to pour it easily, which aided in tasks such as diluting wine in a krater.

The hydria also acted as a funerary urn containing ashes. This function was primarily associated with the hadra hydria. The funerary ceremony was conducted by a royal official who recorded the name of the deceased, their origin, the date of burial and a general inscription. The bronze hydria acted as a prize in tournaments and competitions. This is evident from the painted scenes on vases that illustrate victors carrying a hydria as a reward and inscriptions that identified the bronze hydria as a prize. The high value of a bronze hydria meant it could also function as a dedication to sanctuaries.

== Types ==
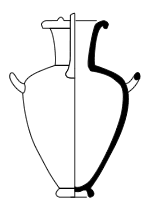
Earliest design of the hydria

=== Hydria ===
The earliest form of the hydria was a large, round shouldered, full-bodied vessel. This shape was commonly used for black-figure pottery during the 6th century BC. Its characteristics included a well-delineated shoulder, an articulated neck and an overhanging ring-shaped (torus) lip. The hydria was manufactured with three handles: two horizontal ones at its sides and a vertical one on its back. It ranged from 33 cm to 50 cm in height and it was glossed on the outside and not on the inside.

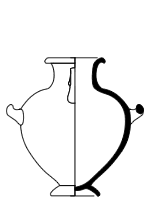
Typical design of the kalpis, a shorter variant of the hydria

=== Kalpis/Calpis ===
The kalpis or calpis (κάλπις) became popular during the 5th century BC and became the preferred vessel of choice for red-figure painters. The kalpis differed from the hydria as it was typically smaller in size, ranging from 25 cm to 42 cm, and its body, shoulder and neck had a continuous curve. Another term associated with a small hydria is hydriske (also called hydriskos, plural hydriskai) which is a diminutive for small hydria. Its vertical handle was cylindrical, attached at the lip rather than the rim, and possessed an in-curved rim compared to the torus lip of the earlier hydria.

=== Hadra hydria ===
This style developed during the Hellenistic period and consisted of a wide squat neck, low pedestal and flaring base. Rather than being cylindrical, the hadra hydria's vertical handle was ribbed and its side handles were gently curved. They were named hadra hydria after the suburb "Hadra" in Alexandria, where they were first discovered in the 19th century. There were two sub-classes of hadra hydria, one categorised by a thick layer of whitewash applied for Polychrome decoration, a feature that is absent from the other forms of the hydria. These were produced in Egypt and intended to reside in tombs. The second class of hadra hydria are named "Clay Ground". These differed from whitewashed hadra hydria as they used dark brown or black paint for decoration, which was directly applied to the vessel's surface. "Clay Ground" hadra hydria were produced in Crete rather than Egypt.

=== Bronze hydria ===
Developed from the 4th century BC onwards, the bronze hydria was a prized form of the hydria. It had a shallow neck and a capacious body. It was highly polished and was often decorated with silver inlays. Bronze hydria were also decorated with objects and patterns. For example, one bronze hydria depicted Dionysus and a satyr. Unlike other forms of the hydria, the bronze hydria had a lid, highlighted from the traces of soldering and the presence of rivet holes found on its rim. Having a lid meant the bronze hydria could act as a funerary urn. There are over three hundred and thirty bronze hydria known, including both complete and incomplete vessels.

== Manufacturing ==
=== Body ===
The process began by "throwing" (from the Old English word thrownاا which means to twist or turn,) the body of the hydria on a potter's wheel, starting with a large ball of clay. This clay ball would be formed into a tall cylinder and then expanded outwards through the use of the potter's hands. With one hand on the outside and one on the inside, the potter's hands would press together and form the upward curve of the hydria. At the shoulder level, the potter would smooth the clay inwards, forming the base of the neck. The shoulder was then smoothed out with a rib tool to remove any throwing striations. The body was then cut off the potter's wheel and set aside to harden.

=== Neck/mouth/lip ===
The neck, mouth and lip were thrown right side up, through a similar process of expanding a smaller lump of clay which was then thinned out and shaped. Once a short cylinder was formed, the clay was then angled outward to form the lip of the hydria. The lip was rounded with a sponge and the neck, mouth and lip were cut off the wheel and left to harden. Similar to the neck amphora, the neck walls of the hydria were also tapered, starting thicker at the base and becoming thinner towards to lip.

=== Joining ===
Once the body and neck had dried, they had to be joined. This was completed through the application of a slip between the shoulder and the neck. The potter would place his hand inside the hydria where the shoulder joined the neck and apply the slip which bonded both the neck and the shoulder. The joining was smoothed out to remove any signing that the sections had been joined.

=== Turning ===
Once the vessel had dried to a leather hard stage, the potter inverted the hydria and began to turn it to form its base into its parabolic shape.

=== Foot ===
The foot was thrown upside down, through a small ball of clay which was spread outwards. The potter would use his thumbs to shape the walls of the foot whilst using his fingers to round the edge of the foot, giving it a Torus shape. It was cut off the potter's wheel and left to dry. Once dried, it was attached to the rest of the hydria through the application of a slip.

=== Handles ===
The hydria has three handles, two horizontal ones at its sides and a vertical one on its back. The horizontal handles were pulled from balls of clay which were then attached below the shoulder on the hydria. The handles were cylindrical and upturned. The vertical handle was also pulled from a ball of clay but it was centre-ridged and oval shaped. It was attached at the lip and shoulder of the hydria. The handles were then burnished by hand rather than on the potter's wheel.

=== Bronze hydriai ===
Beginning with two sheets of bronze, the thin walls of the bronze hydria are hammered and shaped. Bronze hydrias with a pronounced shoulder were hammered in two parts. First, a metal disk was shaped to form a neck. Then, a tube flaring at both ends was welded to where the shoulder met the neck of the hydria. The other parts of the hydria; the foot, handles and mouth were not hammered, but instead cast and attached through welding or soldering. For its decoration, the bronze hydria was polished, as it created a bright sheen and lustre, but silver inlays were also used for its decoration. Its handles were sometimes decorated with patterns or objects, such as palmettes.

== Contribution and examples ==
The contribution of the hydria is displayed through its decoration and inscriptions. Its decoration often depicted mythological stories and scenes of daily life. The inscriptions provide information such as the potter's name, date and purpose of the hydria. Inscriptions can increase scholarly understanding of Ancient Greek culture, and its development over time, as well as help create a chronological timeline of the development of pottery in Ancient Greece. Decorations can also highlight the particular use of the hydria. For example, bronze hydrias decorated with figures relating to love were gifts to brides, whilst those decorated with Dionysus, were used by men at gala dinner parties.

=== Caputi hydria ===
The Caputi hydria provides insight into the role of working women in classical Athens. Due to the lack of written sources surrounding working women in Athens during the 5th century BC, it was noted that women in trades were non-existent and confined to household duties. However, the Caputi hydria depicts women decorating a vase in a pottery workshop, although scholars have debated whether it was a metal workshop. Notwithstanding the academic debate, scholars such as G. M. A. Richter and J. D. Beazley agree this proved the existence of female painters, and women in trades.

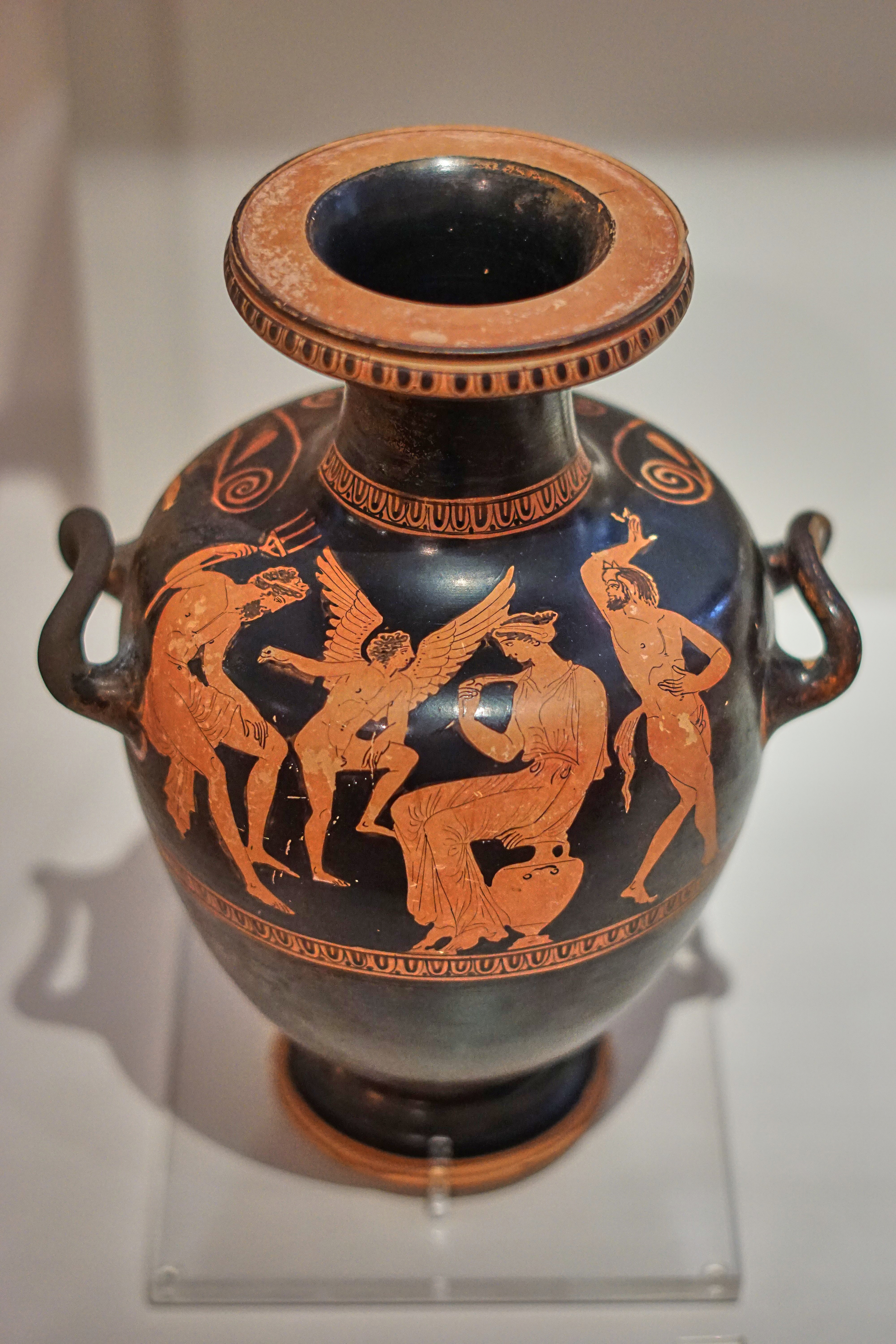
Hydria. Poseidon and Amymone, with Eros between them. The presence of a Satyr behind Amymone suggests that the scene was probably inspired by a satyr play. From Atalanti. By the Hippolytos Painter. 375–350 BC.

=== Inscribed hadra hydria ===
Inscriptions noted on several hadra hydria in the Metropolitan Museum of Art contain the names of artists, potters, important historical figures and dates. These inscriptions are important as they provide contextual information that helps to establish the date of the pottery which contributes to its chronological timeline. Important figures that existed during that time are also highlighted which can fill information that written sources cannot provide. For example, on one hadra hydria, the inscription translates to "Year 9; Sotion son of Kleon of Delphi, Member of the Sacred Embassy announcing the Soteria; by Theodotos, agorastes". From this inscription, a date can be approximated, which was 212 BC. insight into the political offices that existed is also provided, as well as the names of government officials.

=== The Friedlaender hydria ===
This 6th century black-figure hydria is decorated with multiple mythological reliefs. On the body of the hydria, it shows Hercules struggle with the Triton (otherwise known as Nereus or the Old Man of the Sea) with Poseidon and Amphitrite watching on the side. Two more figures reside on the left of Hercules, identified as Hermes and Athena, longtime companions of Hercules. On its shoulder, five figures are about to engage in battle. The central figure of the five is a herald, whilst the figures on either side are dressed with Corinthian helmets and armour, holding Boeotian shields. The shoulder relief is reflecting the mythological battle between Hector and Ajax that occurred in the Iliad. The central figure represents the herald Idaios, who tries to interrupt the battle. The reliefs on the Friedlaender hydria and its shape help to place it chronologically in the 6th century BC and establish a timeline for different series of hydrias.

== See also ==
- Aquamanile
- Olla
