= List of equestrian statues in Italy =

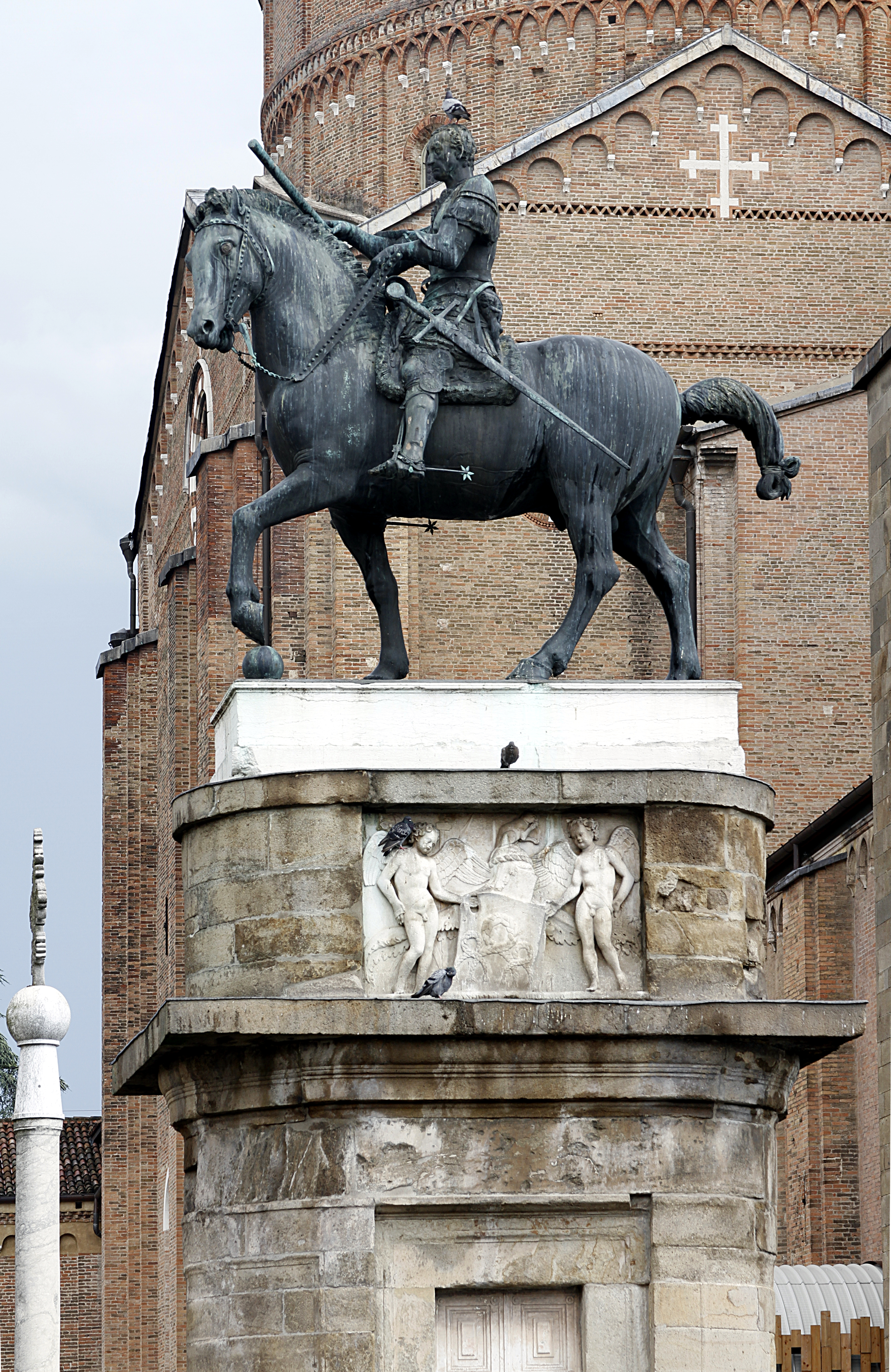
The earliest surviving Renaissance equestrian statue: Equestrian statue of Gattamelata by Donatello, on Piazza del Santo, Padua, 1453

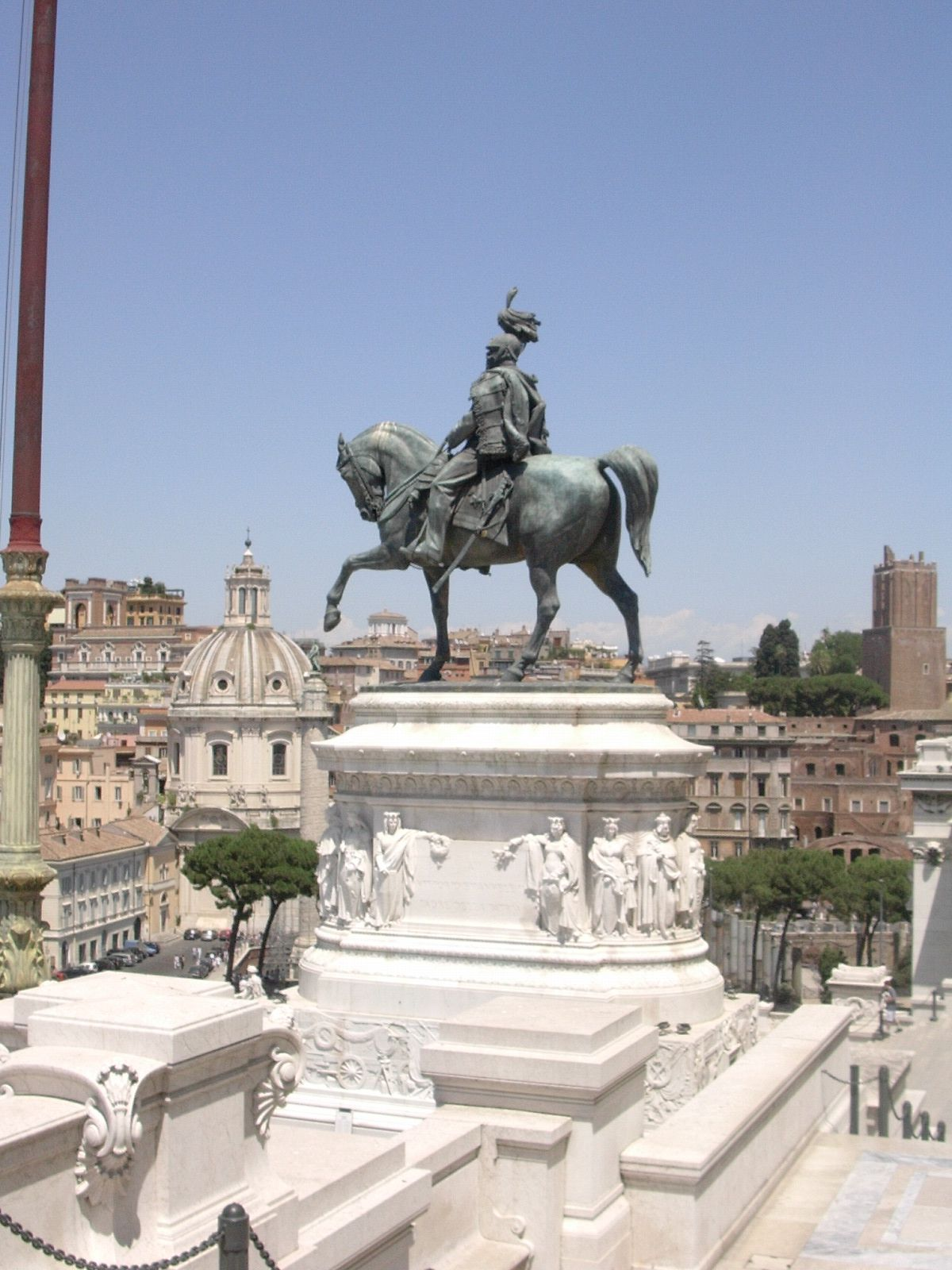
The equestrian statue of King Victor Emmanuel II, architectural centre of the Altare della Patria in Rome, whose marble base the statues of the Italian noble cities are carved

This is a list of equestrian statues in Italy.

Frequently represented persons:

- Giuseppe Garibaldi (1807–1882), celebrated as one of the greatest generals of modern times and as the "Hero of the Two Worlds" because of his military enterprises in South America and Europe, who fought in many military campaigns that led to Italian unification. He was a general, revolutionary and republican. He is considered to be one of Italy's "fathers of the fatherland".
- Victor Emmanuel II (1820–1878), Italian: Vittorio Emanuele II. He was King of Sardinia (also informally known as Piedmont–Sardinia) from 23 March 1849 until 17 March 1861, when he assumed the title of King of Italy and became the first king of an independent, united Italy since the 6th century, a title he held until his death in 1878. Borrowing from the old Latin title Pater Patriae of the Roman emperors, the Italians gave him the epithet of "Father of the Fatherland" (Italian: Padre della Patria).

== Rome ==
- Equestrian Statue of Marcus Aurelius, 4.24 metres (13.9 ft) tall, Roman bronze equestrian in the Capitoline Museums, previously on Piazza del Campidoglio, second half of the 2nd century.
- Replica of the Equestrian Statue of Marcus Aurelius, at Piazza del Campidoglio
- Equestrian statue of Victor Emmanuel II of Italy, 12 m tall, on the Monument to Vittorio Emanuele II, between the Piazza Venezia and the Capitoline Hill
- Equestrian of Umberto I, at Villa Borghese
- Equestrian of Giuseppe Garibaldi by Emilio Gallori at the Piazza Garibaldi, 1895.
- Equestrian of Anita Garibaldi by Mario Rutelli located 200m north of the Piazza Garibaldi alongside the Viale aldo Fabrizi, 1932.
- Equestrian of Skanderbeg, at Piazza Albania
- Equestrian of King Carlo Alberto in the center of the Quirinale Gardens
- Equestrian of Emperor Constantine I by Bernini, north end of the narthex in St. Peter's Basilica, Vatican City, 1670.
- Equestrian of Charlemagne by Cornacchini, south end of the narthex in St. Peter's Basilica, Vatican City, 18th century.
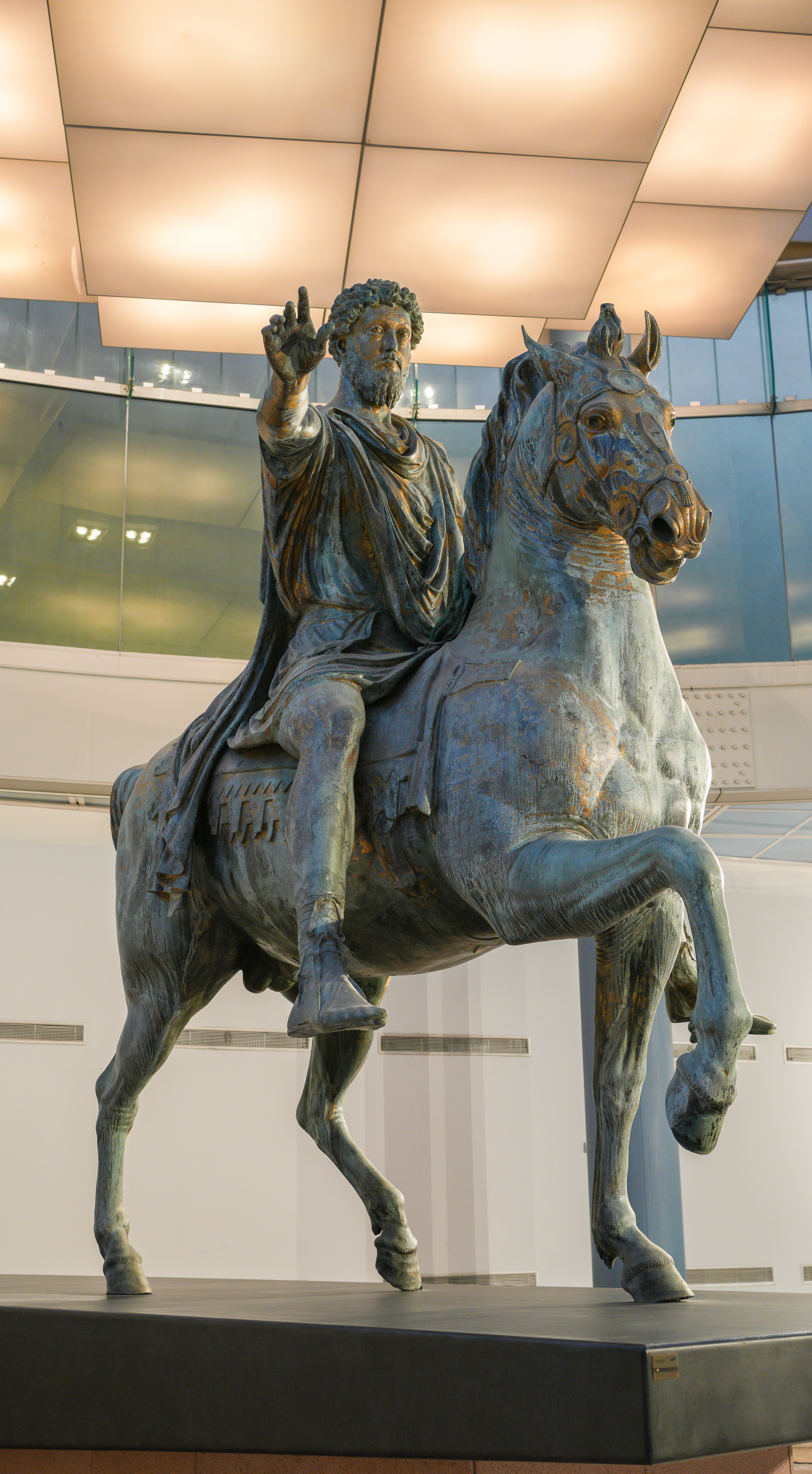
Original statue of Marcus Aurelius in the Capitoline Museums

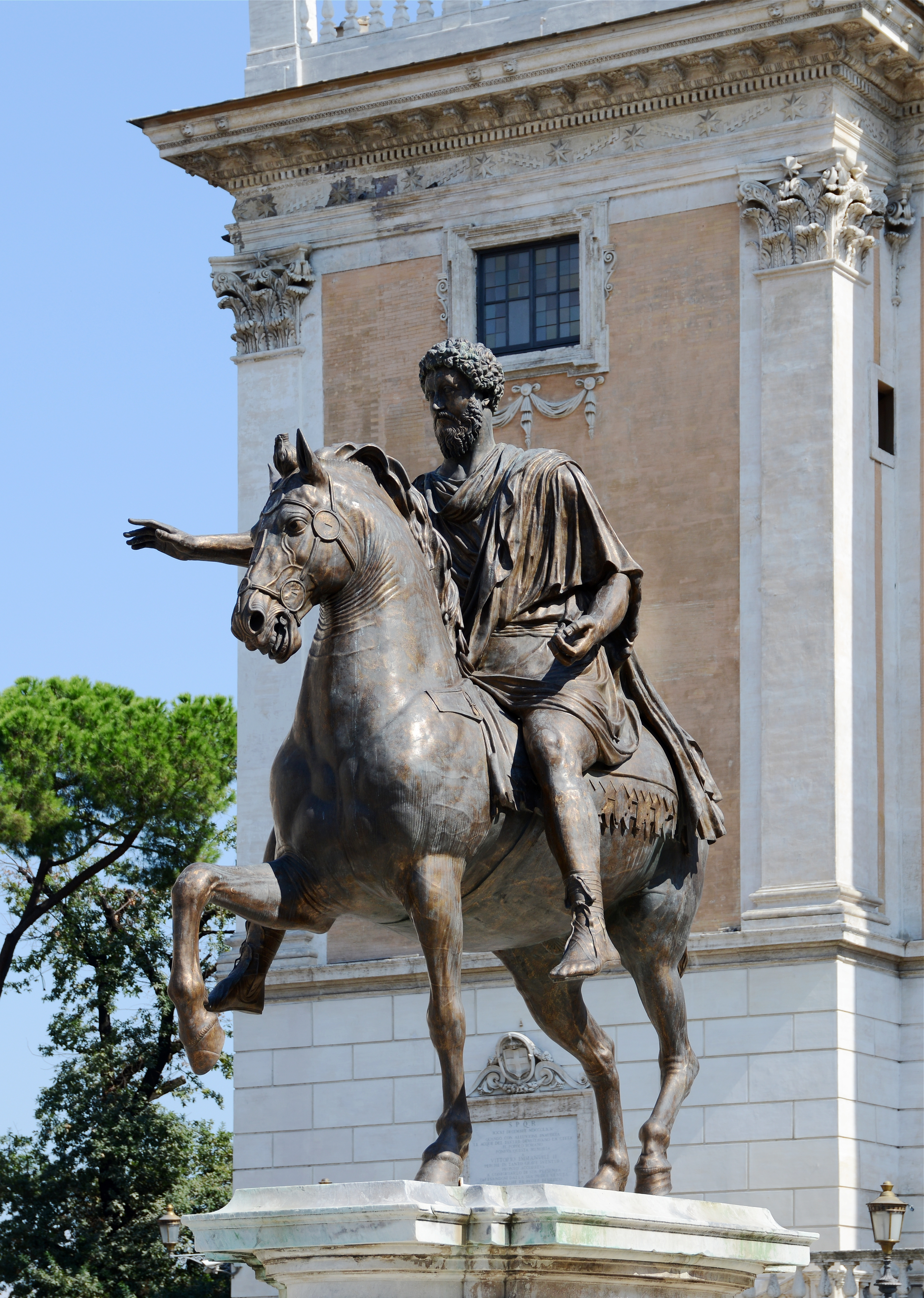
Marcus Aurelius at Piazza del Campidoglio

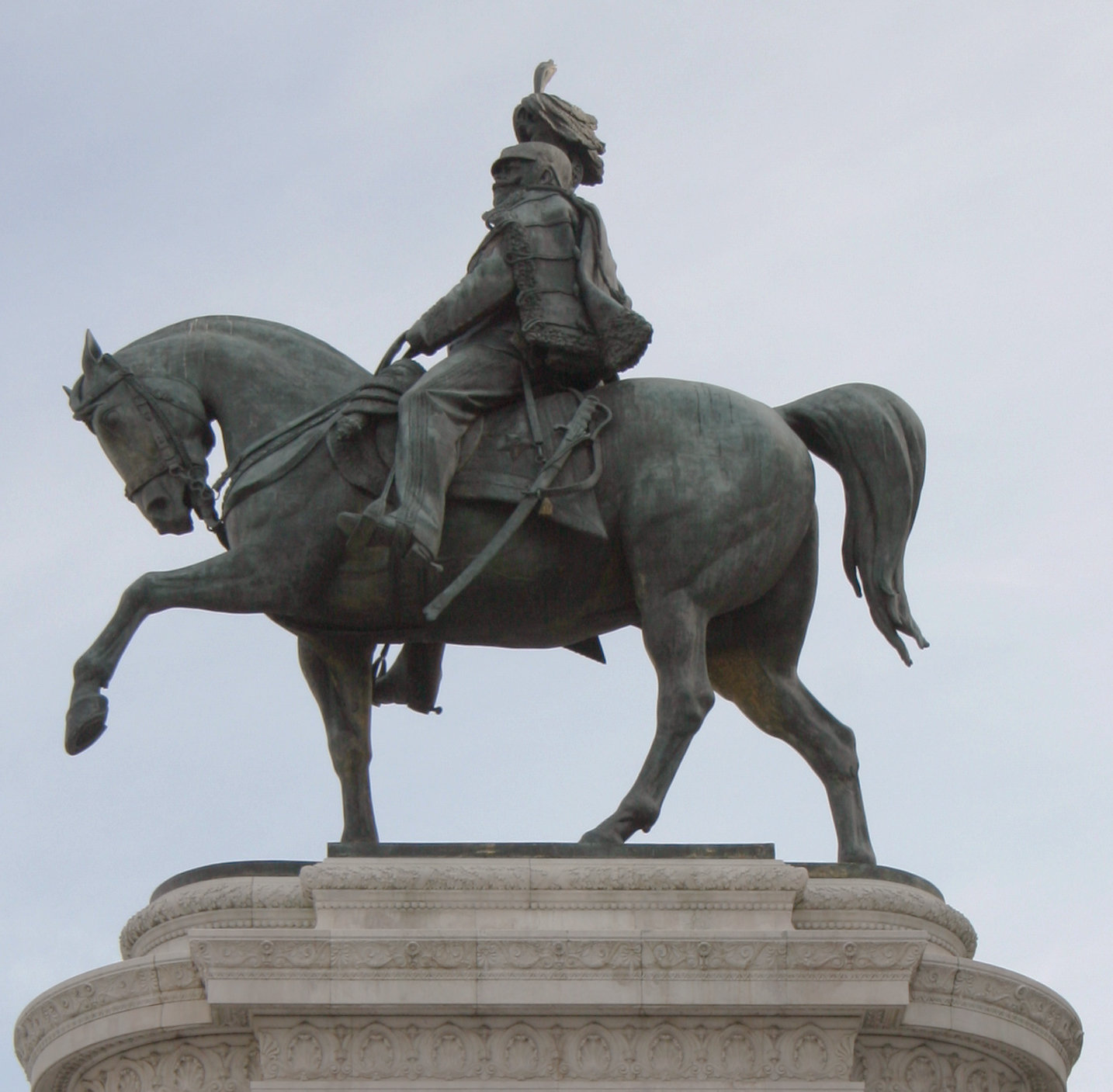
King Victor Emmanuel II at Piazza Venezia

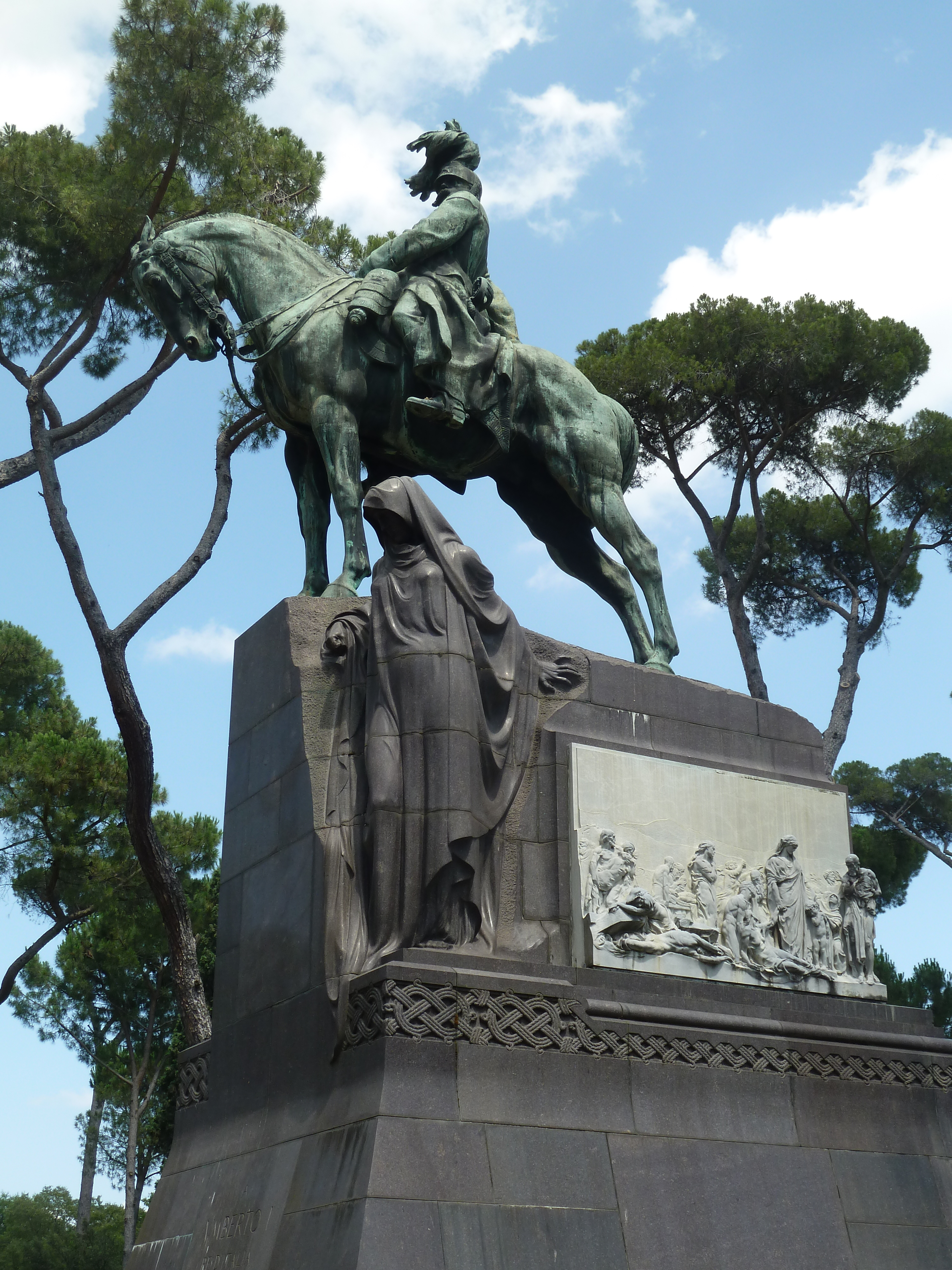
King Umberto I at Villa Borghese

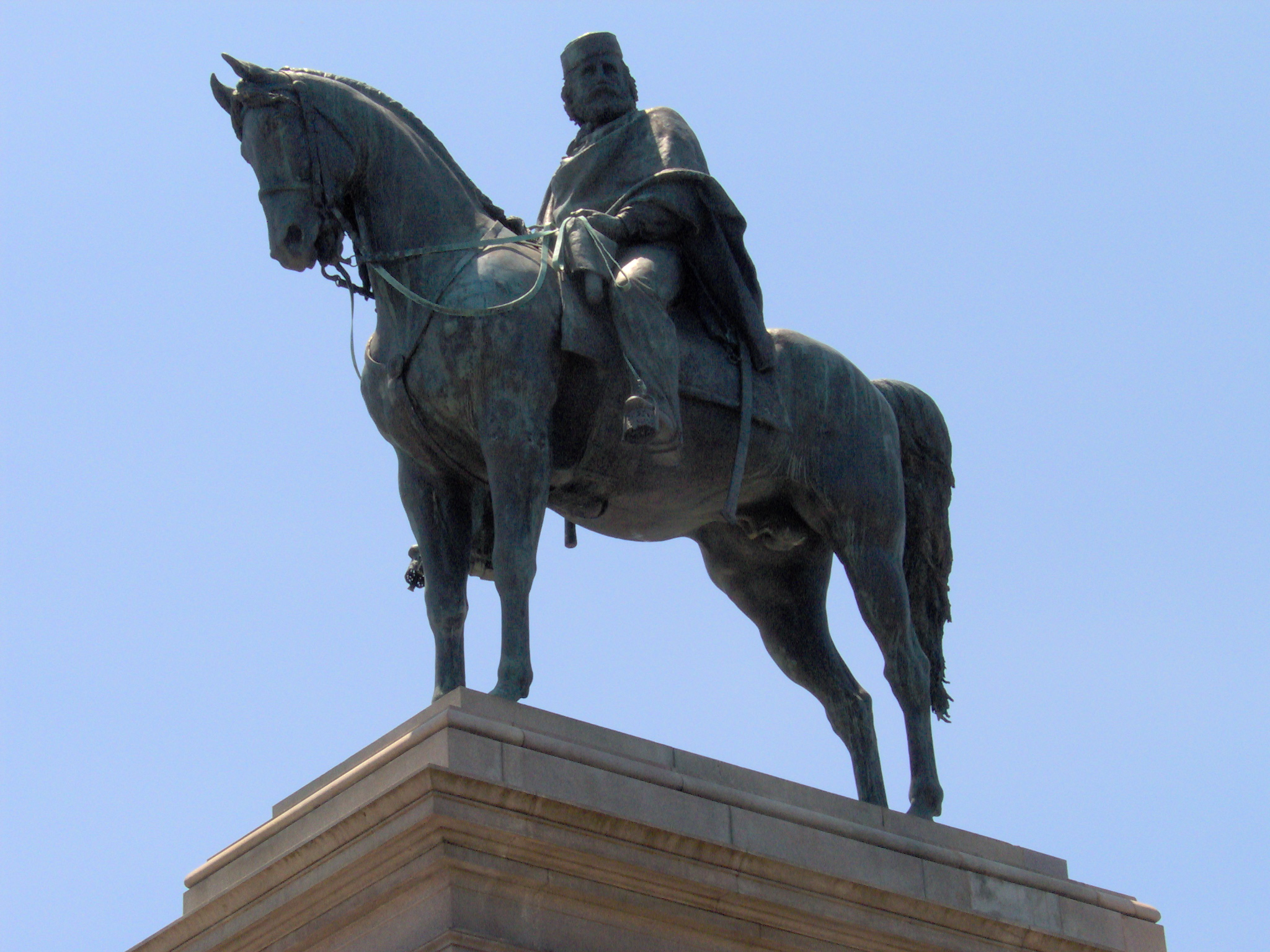
Giuseppe Garibaldi at Gianicolo

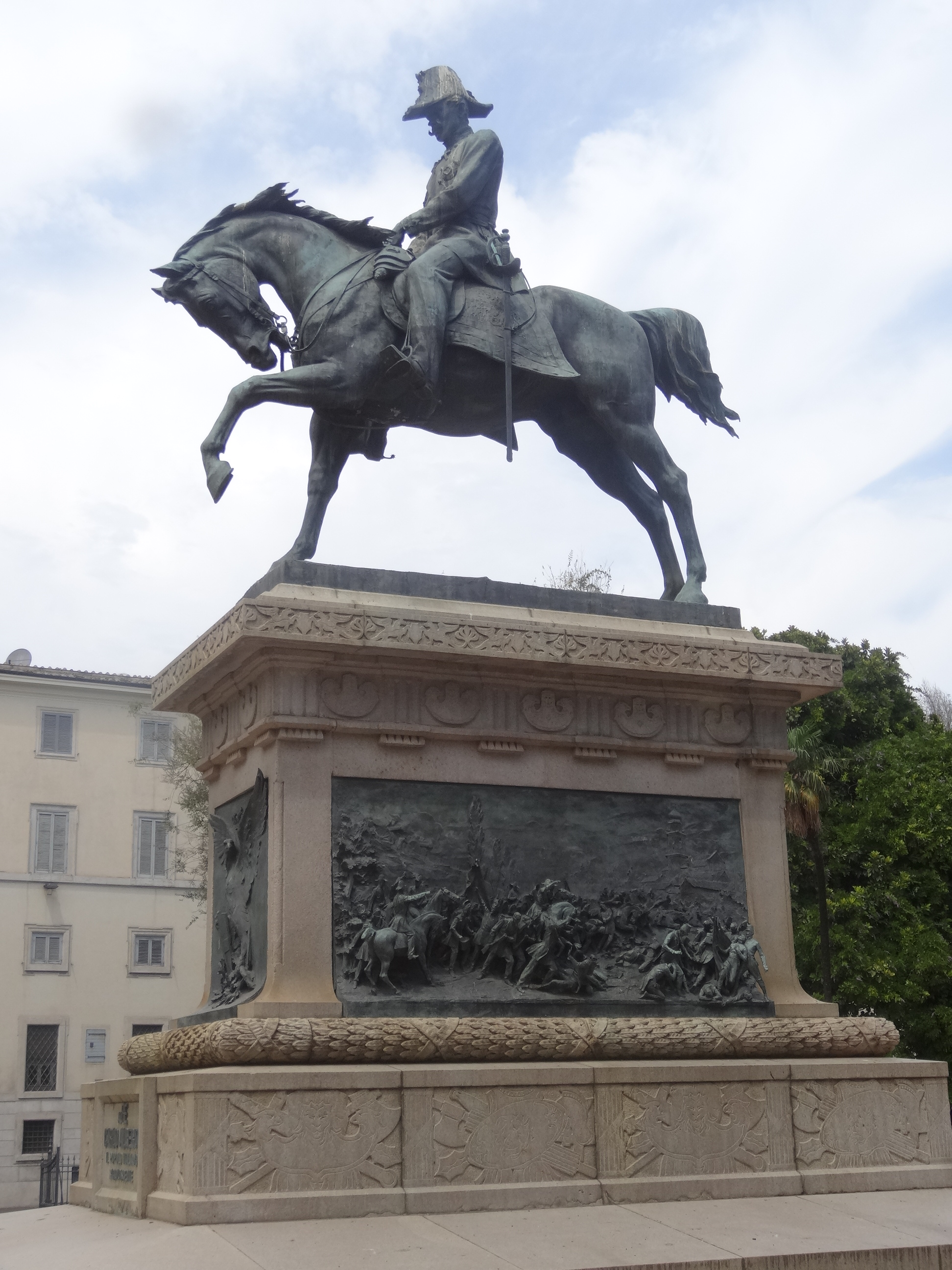
King Carlo Alberto at the Quirinale Palace

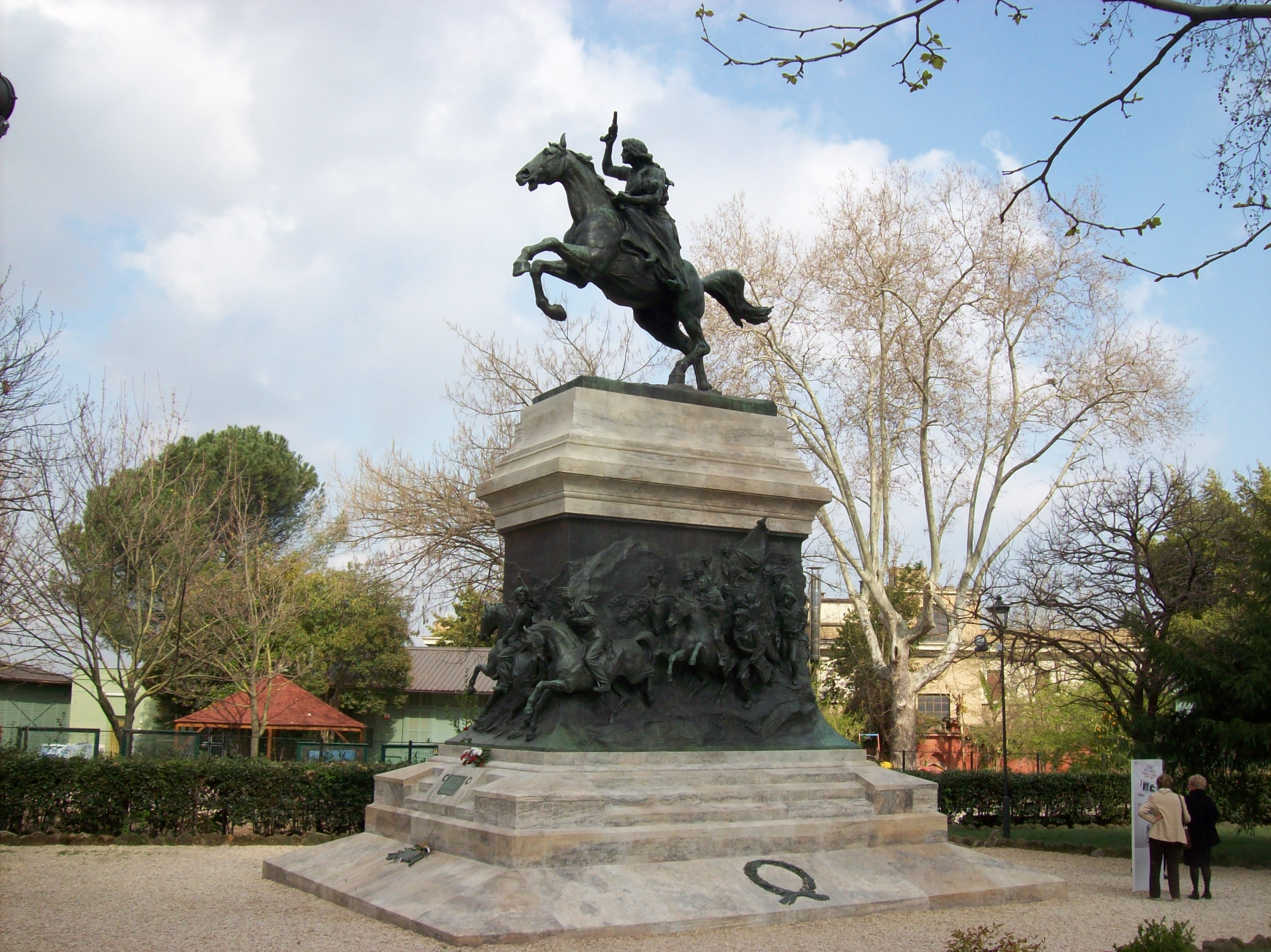
Anita Garibaldi 200m N of Piazza Garibaldi

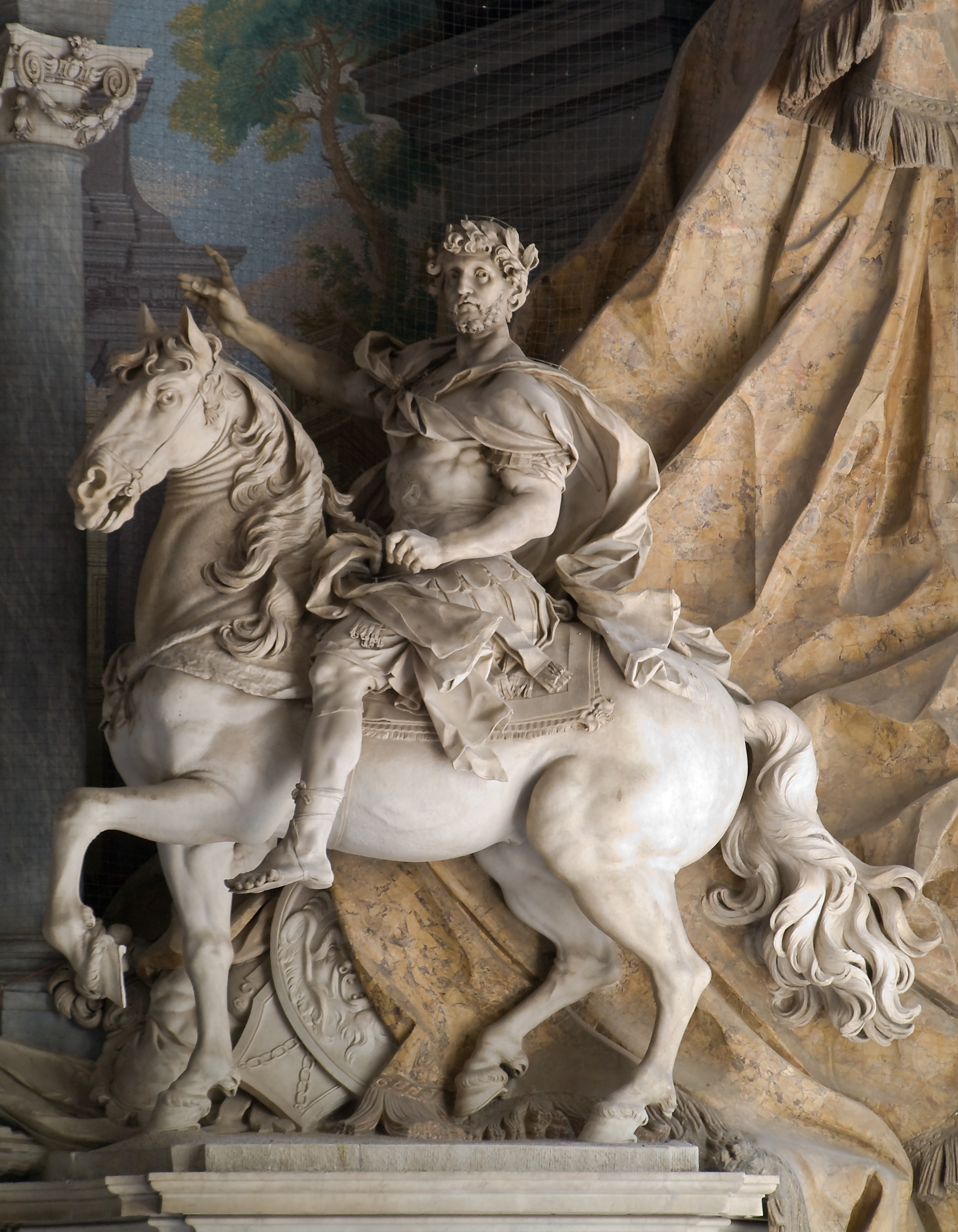
Charlemagne in St. Peter's Basilica

== Assisi ==
- Equestrian statue of Francis of Assisi, in the Upper Courtyard of the Basilica of San Francesco d'Assisi

== Asti ==
- Umberto I by Odoardo Tabacchi, at Piazza Cairoli
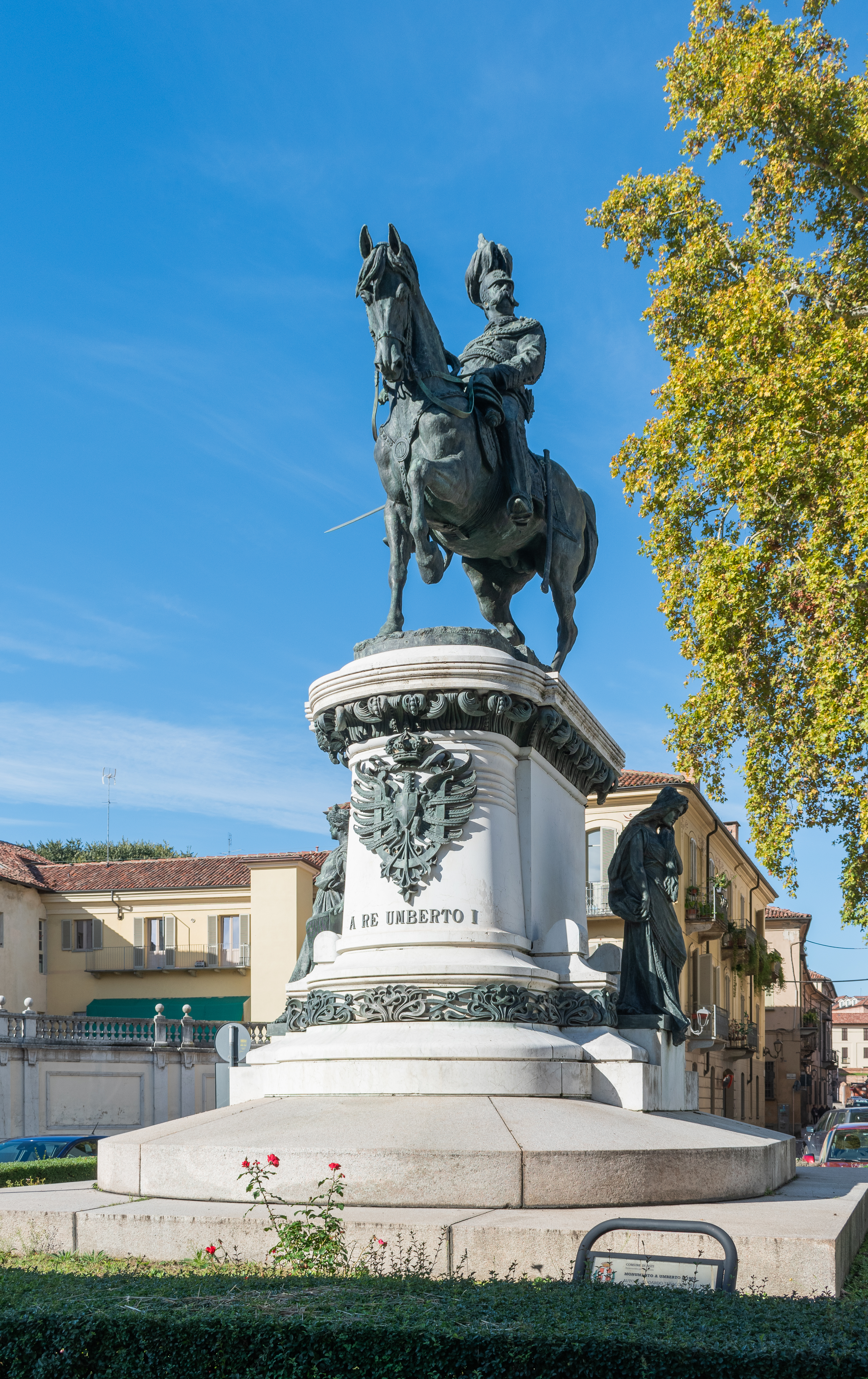

== Bergamo ==
- Monument on the Bartolomeo Colleoni's tomb in Cappella Colleoni. Aureate wood by Leonardo Siry and Sisto da Norimberga.
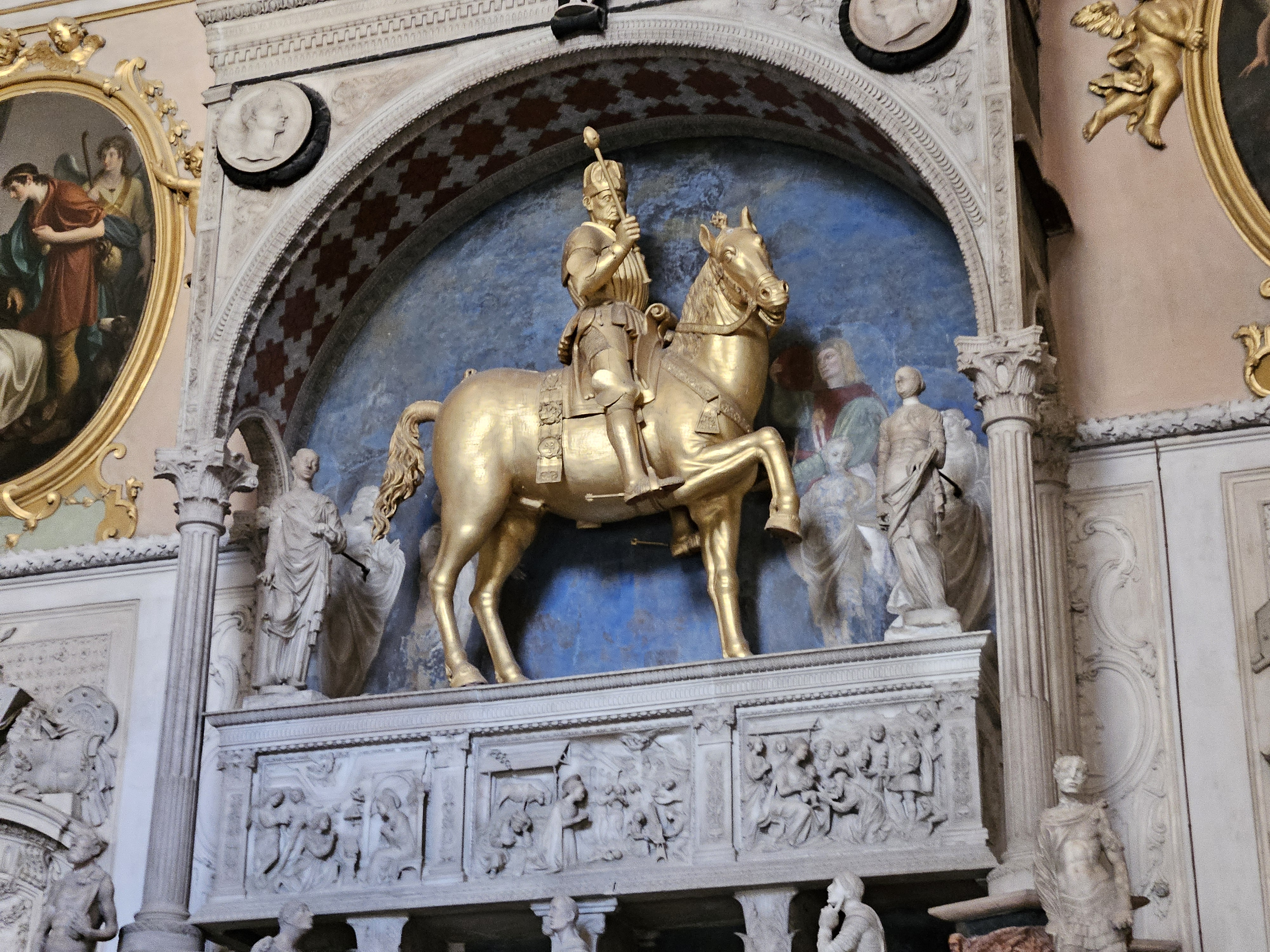
Bartolomeo Colleoni in Bergamo

== Bologna ==
- Equestrian of Giuseppe Garibaldi in the Via Indipendenza.
- Equestrian of Benito Mussolini by Giuseppe Graziosi at Stadio Renato Dall'Ara (no longer existent)
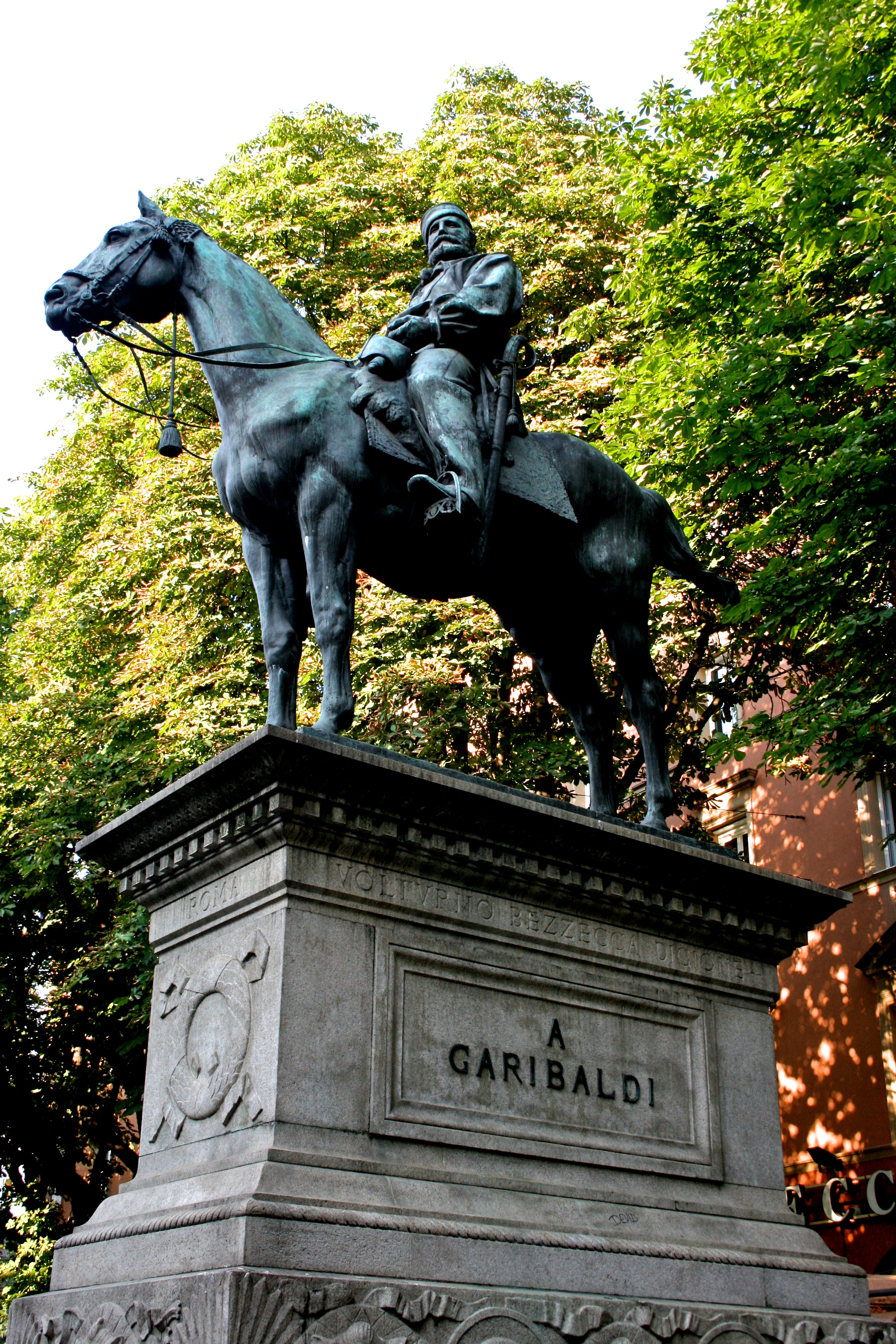
Giuseppe Garibaldi in Bologna

== Brescia ==
- Equestrian of Giuseppe Garibaldi by Eugenio Maccagnani at the Piazza Garibaldi, 1889.
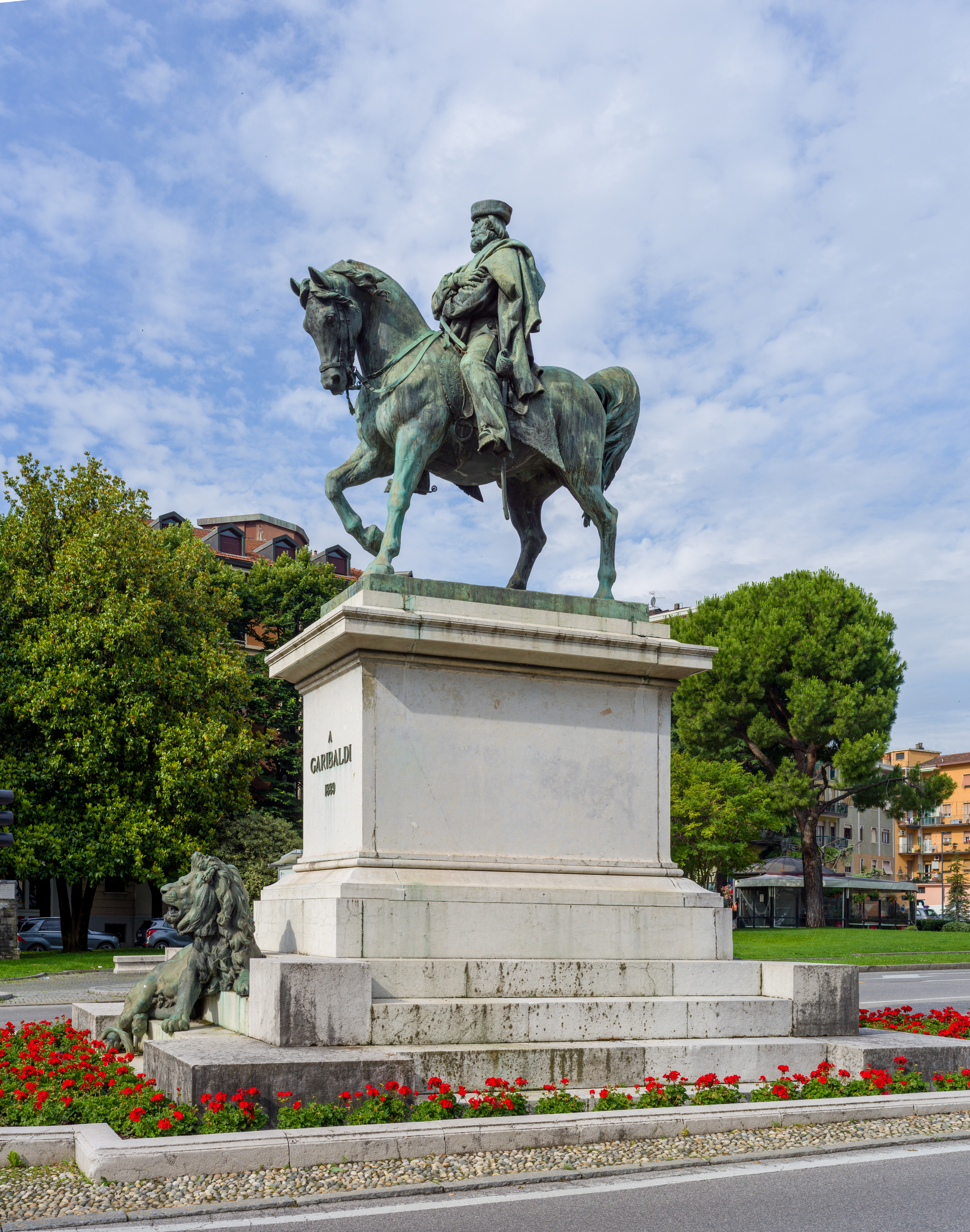
Giuseppe Garibaldi in Brescia

== Casale Monferrato ==
- Carlo Alberto on Piazza Giuseppe Mazzini
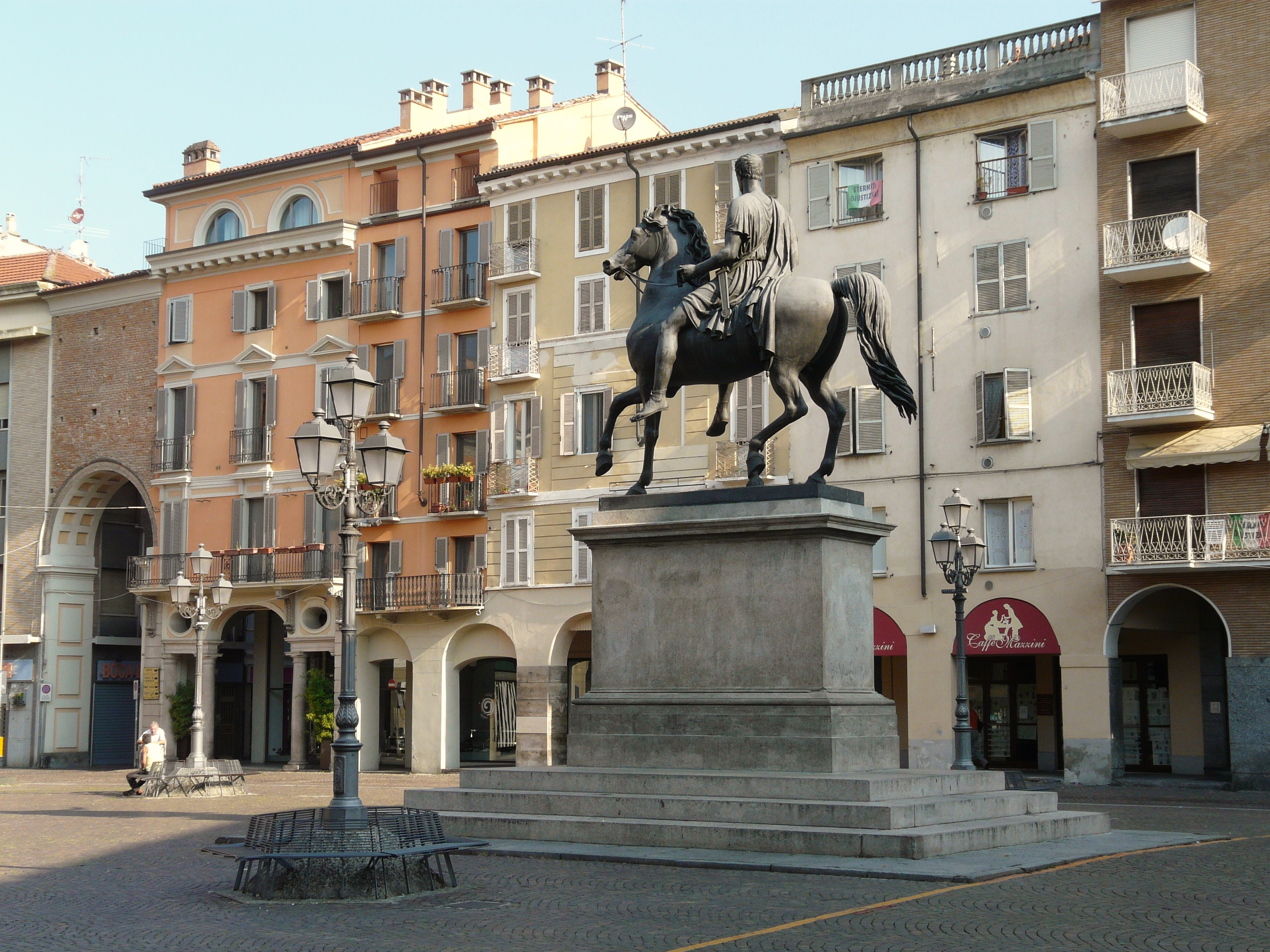
Carlo Alberto

== Ferrara ==
- Monument to Niccolò III d'Este by Giacomo Zilocchi at piazza della Cattedrale, 1927.
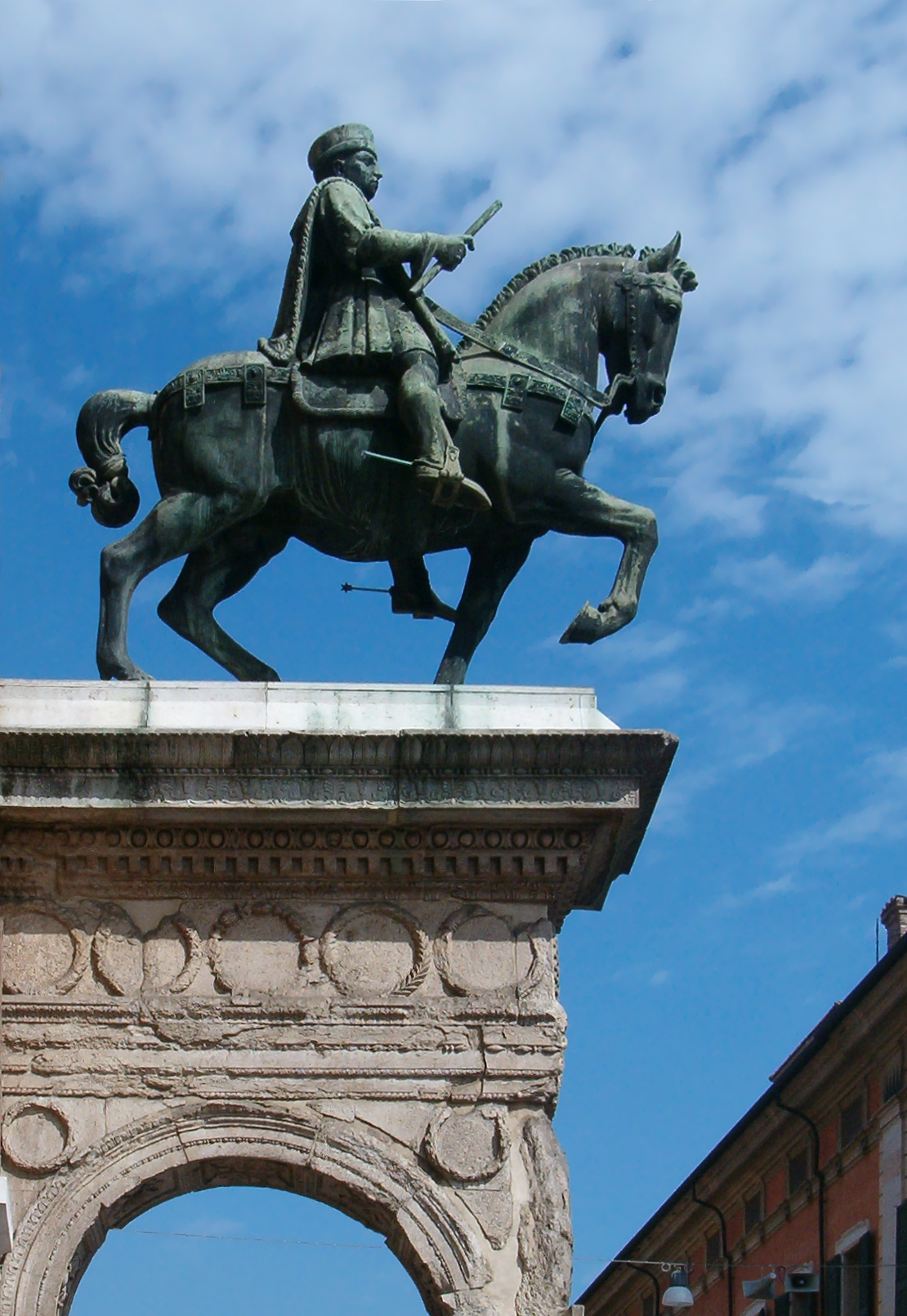
Niccolò III d'Este

== Fiesole ==
- L'incontro di Teano by Oreste Calzolari, equestrian statues of Vittorio Emanuele II and Giuseppe Garibaldi at Piazza Mino, 1906
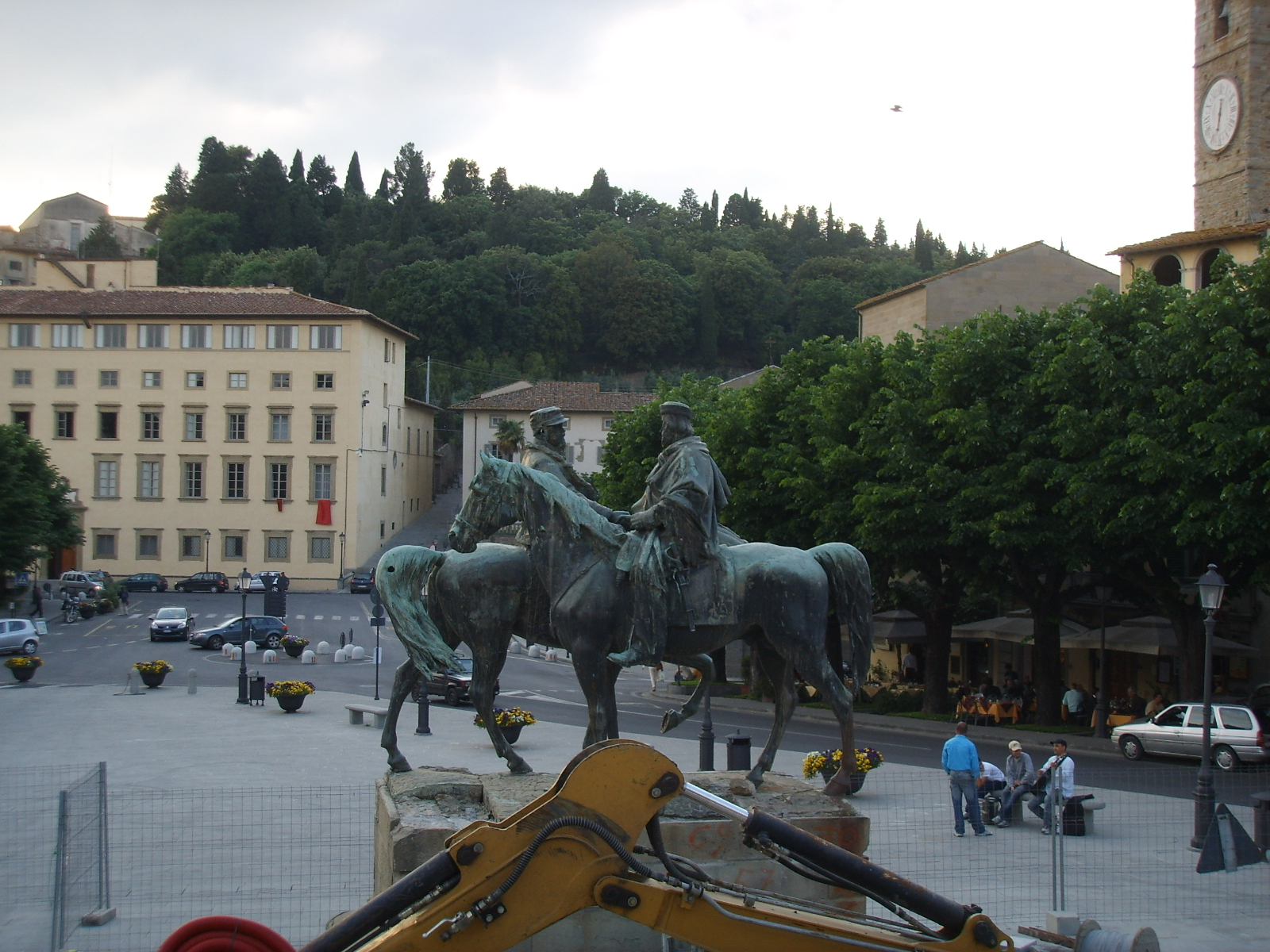
L'incontro di Teano at Piazza Mino

== Florence ==
- Giambologna's and Pietro Tacca's Equestrian Monument of Ferdinando I (1608) on the Piazza della Santissima Annunziata.
- Cosimo I de' Medici by Giambologna (1598) on the Piazza della Signoria.
- Equestrian of Victor Emmanuel II at the Parco delle Cascine.
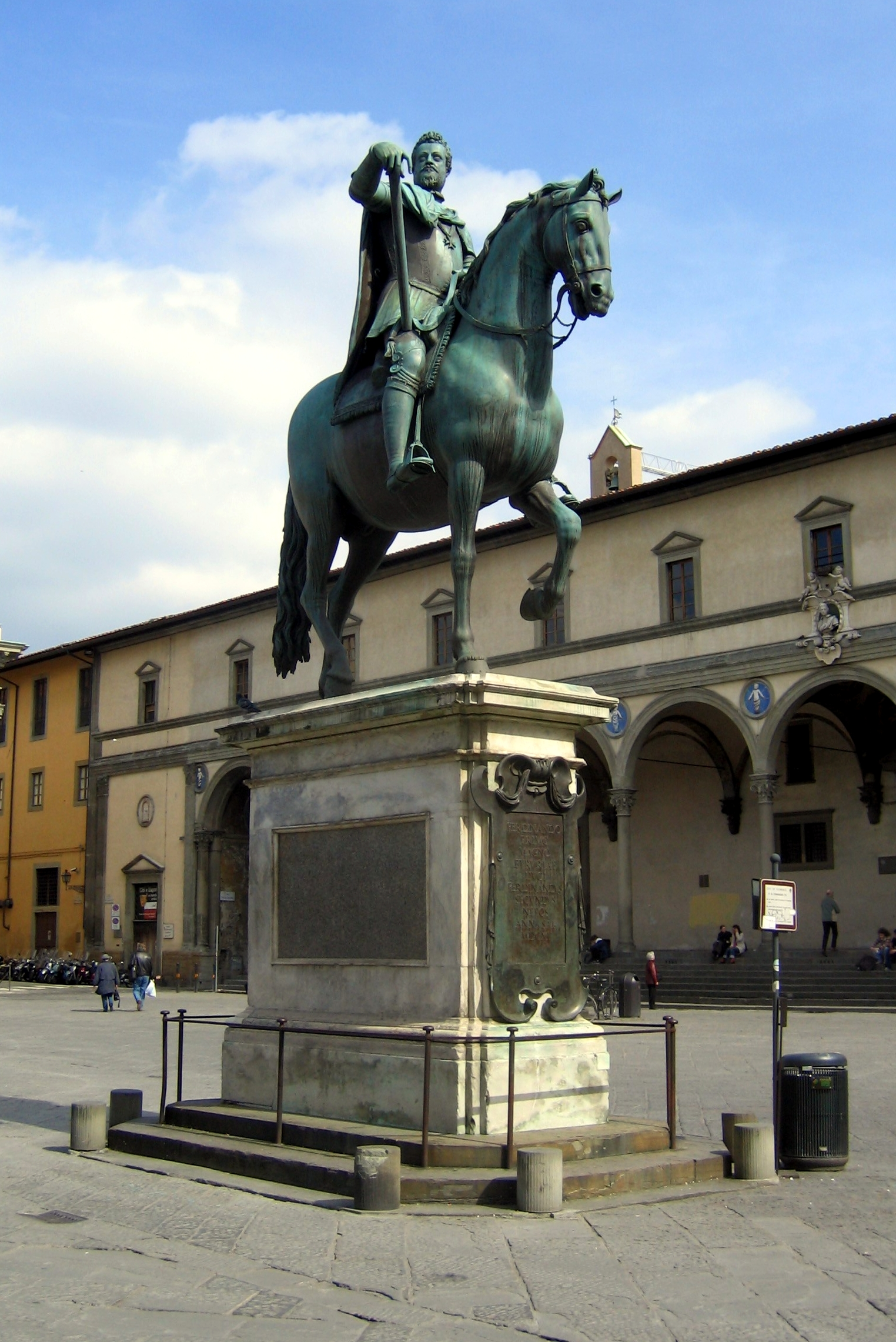
Ferdinando I de' Medici in Florence

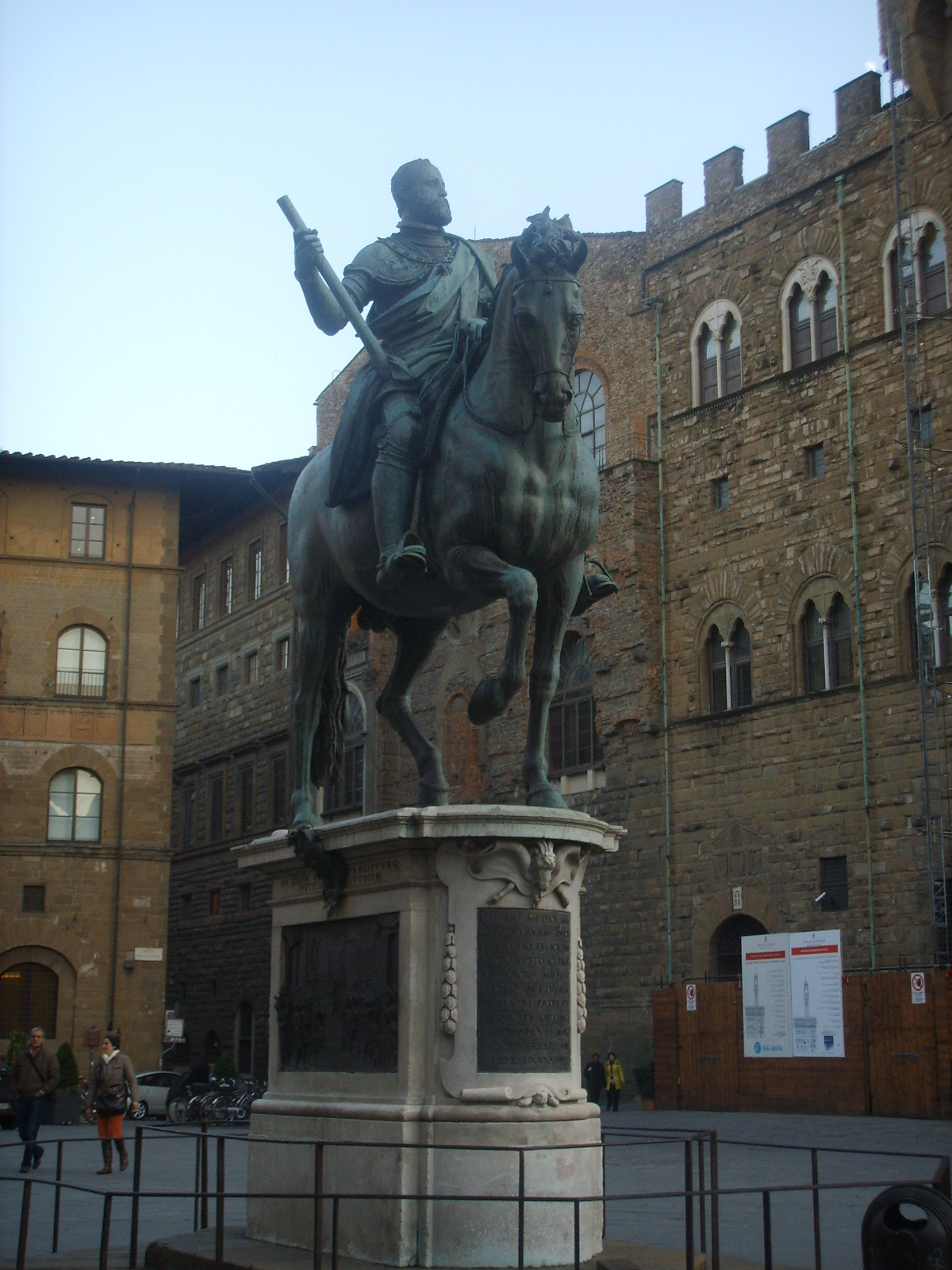
Cosimo I de' Medici in Florence

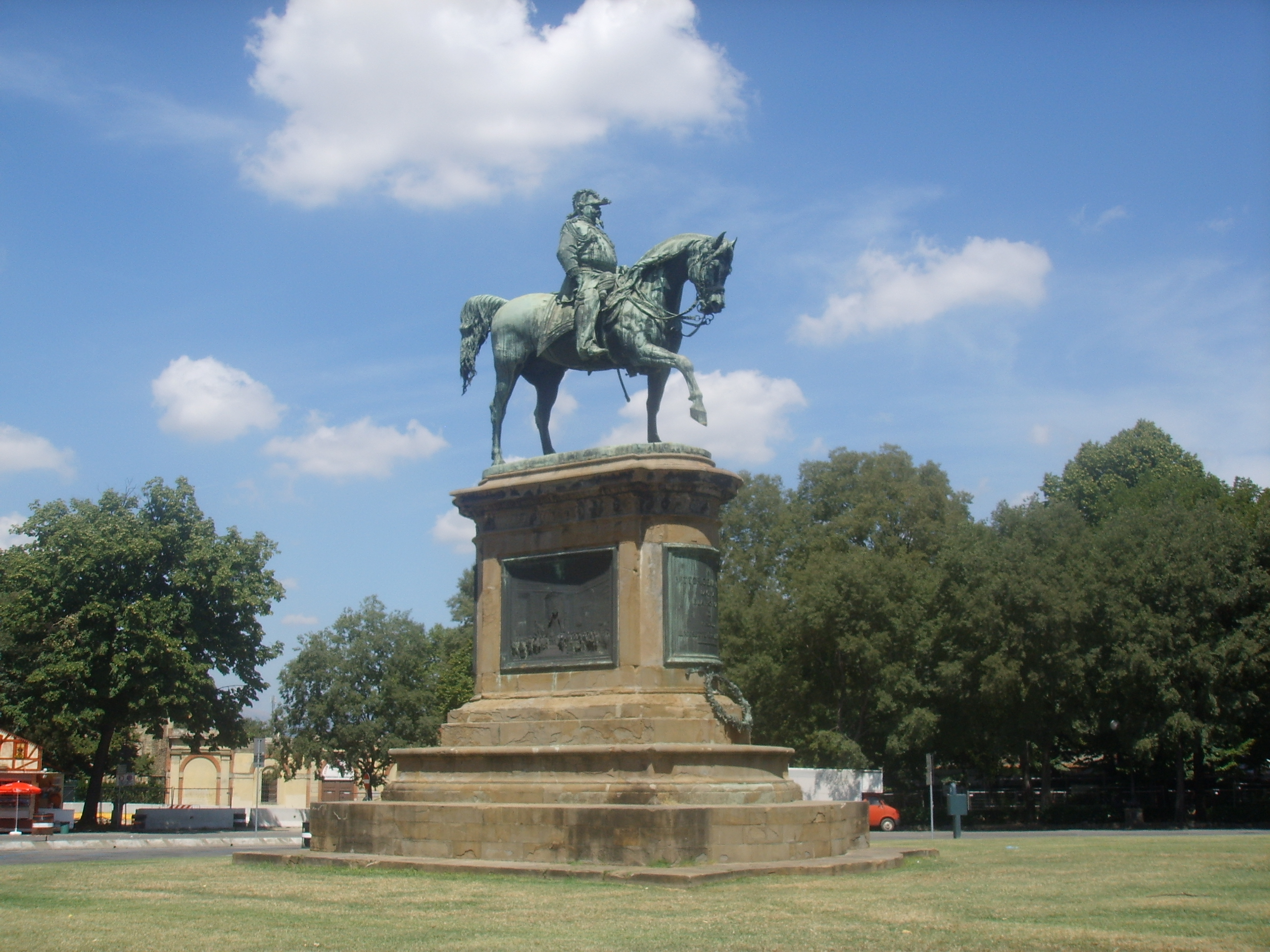
Victor Emmanuel II in Florence

== Genova ==
- Equestrian of Giuseppe Garibaldi by Augusto Rivalta at the Piazza De Ferrari, 1879.
- Equestrian of Victor Emmanuel II at the Piazza Corvetto.
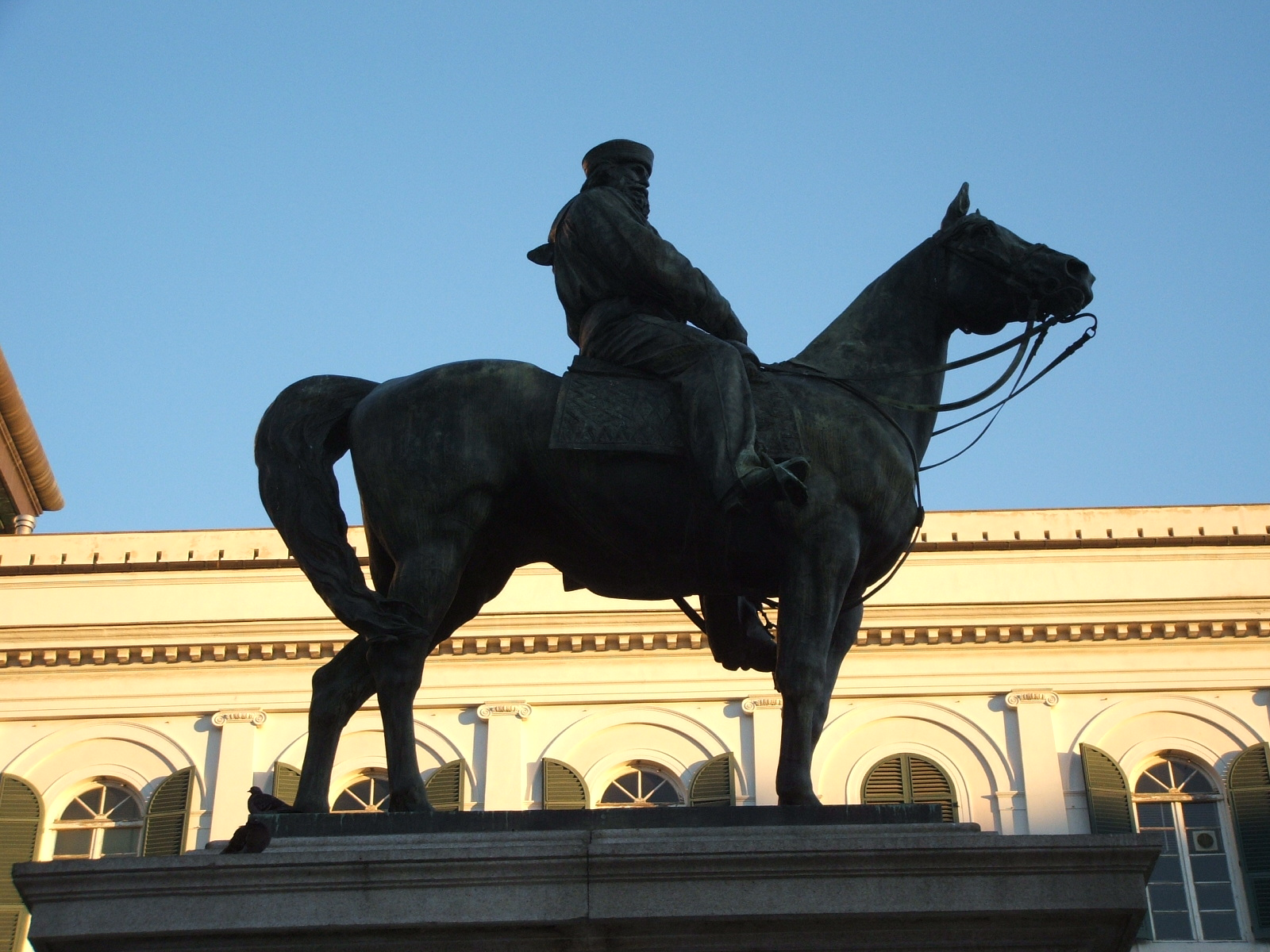
Giuseppe Garibaldi in Genova

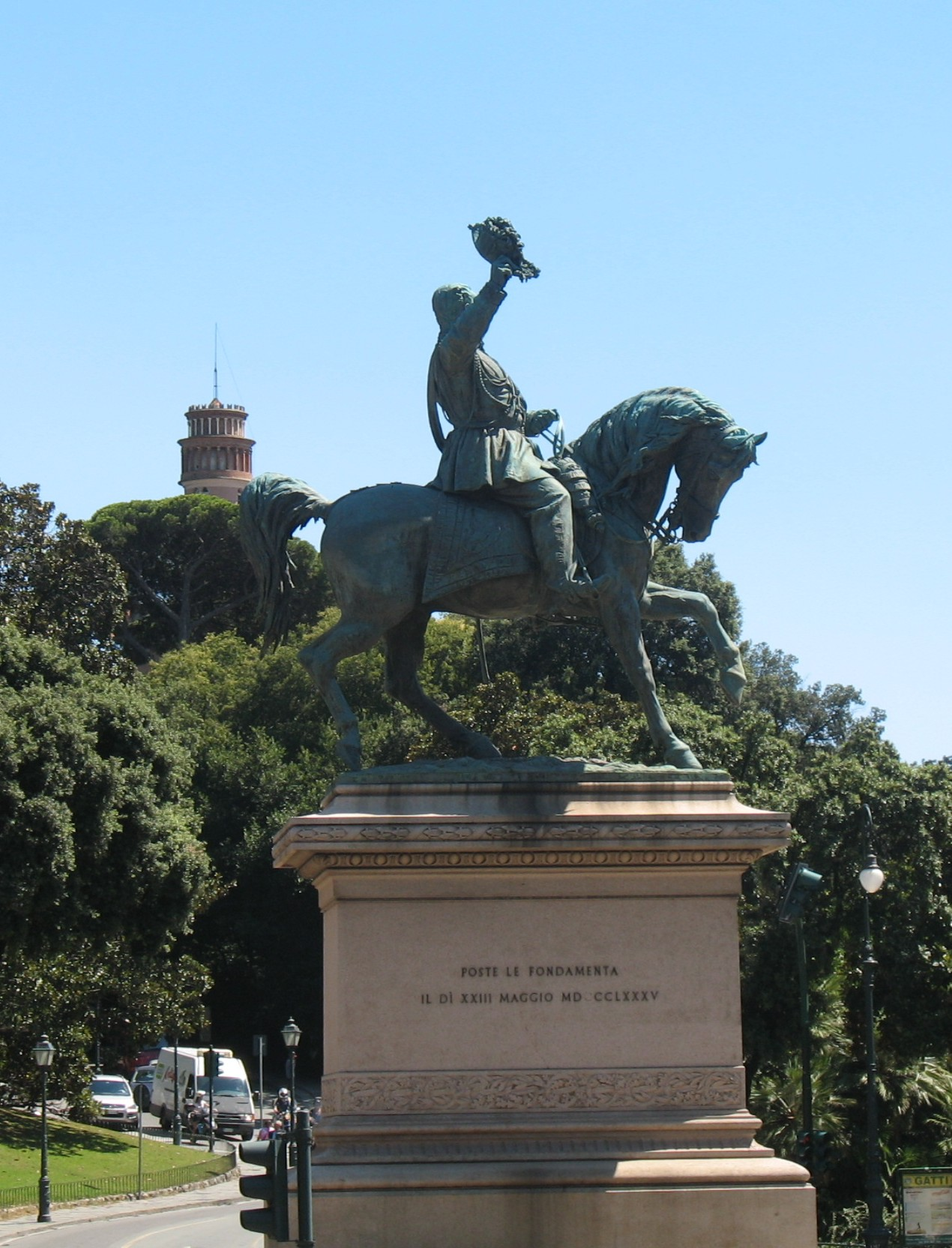
Victor Emmanuel II in Genova

== La Spezia ==
- Equestrian monument to Giuseppe Garibaldi by Antonio Garella, 1913.
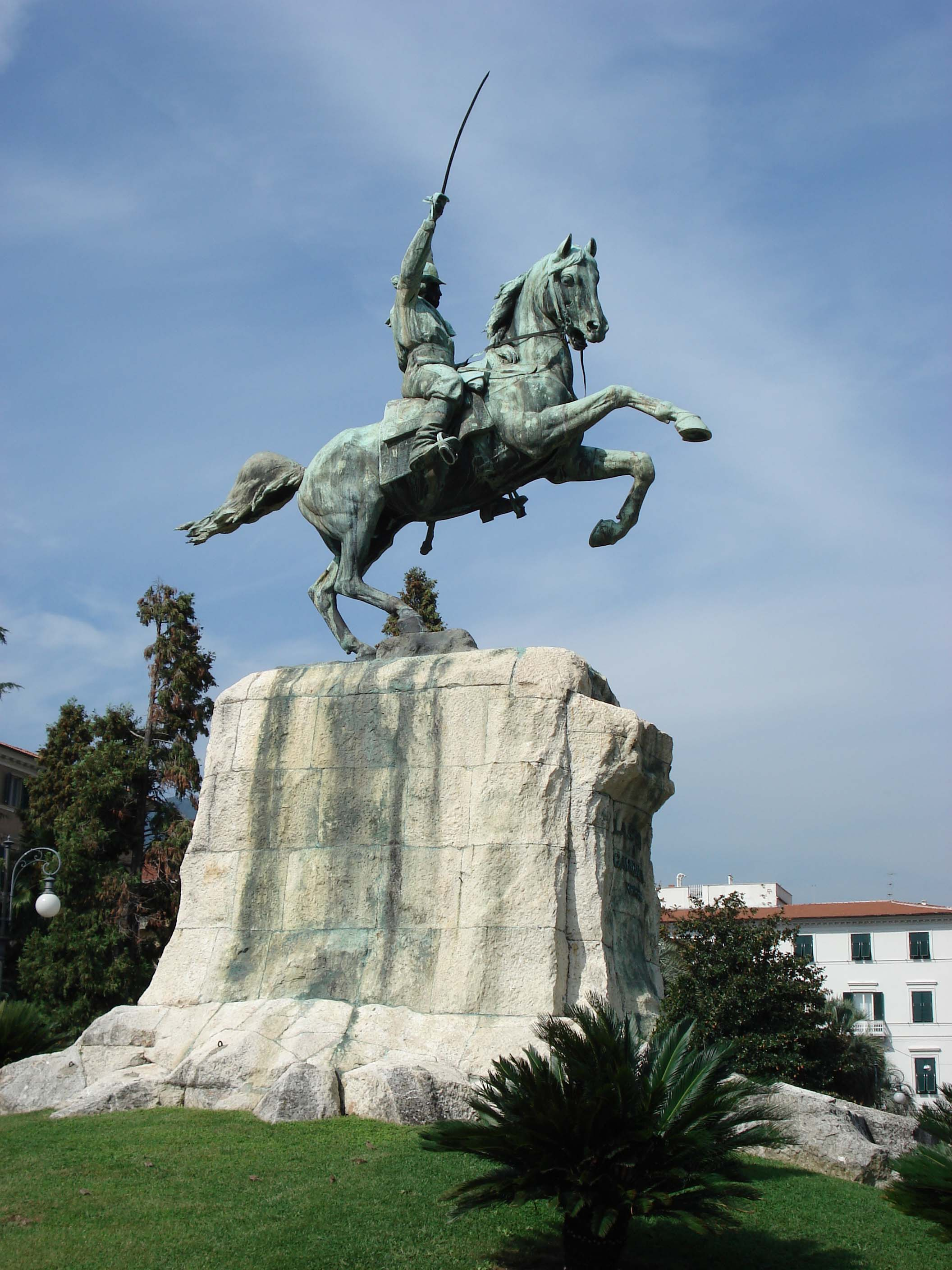
Giuseppe Garibaldi in La Spezia

== Livorno ==
- Equestrian of Victor Emmanuel II by Augusto Rivalta.
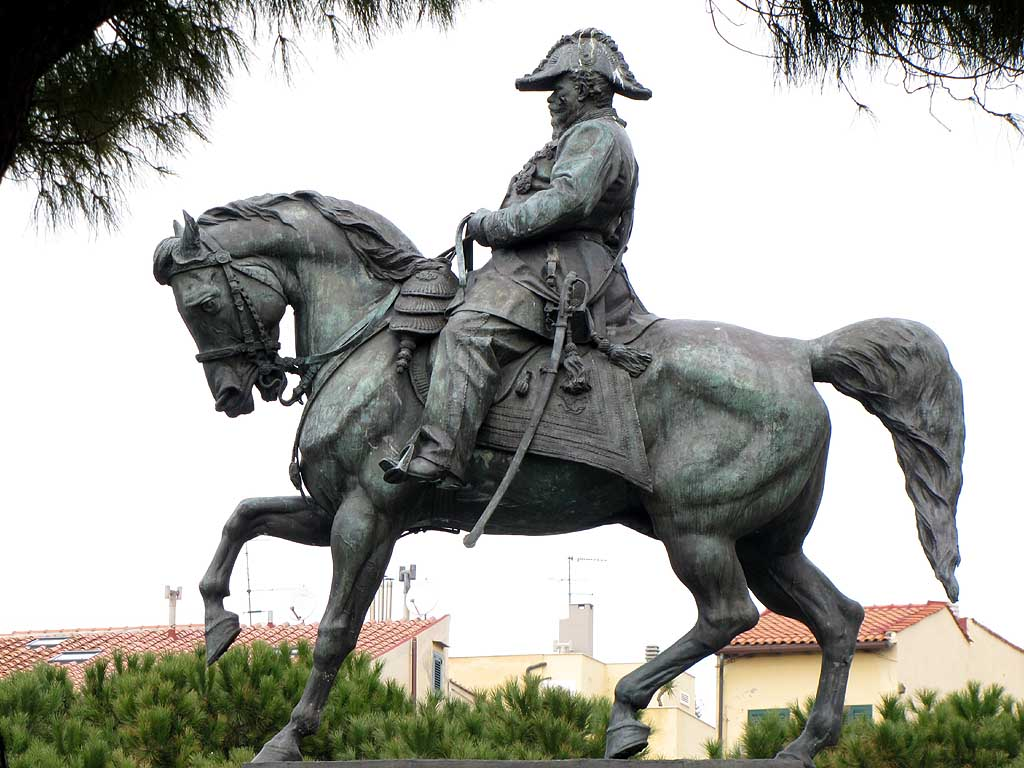
Victor Emmanuel II in Livorno

== Lodi ==
- Monument to Frederick I Barbarossa by Felice Vanelli, 2008

== Milan ==
- Monument to Bernabò Visconti by Bonino da Campione, originally in San Giovanni in Conca, now in the Museo di arte antica, Castello Sforzesco, 1363.
- Equestrian monument to Victor Emmanuel II by Ercole Rosa at the Piazza del Duomo, 1896.
- Equestrian of Giuseppe Garibaldi by Ettore Ximenes at the Piazzale Carioli ("Piazza Castello"), 1895.
- Equestrian of General General Giuseppe Missori by Riccardo Ripamonti at the Piazza Missori, 1916.
- Clay model of the horse for equestrian statue to Francesco I Sforza was completed by Leonardo da Vinci in Milan 1492; cast as an equine statue and placed in Milan outside the racetrack of Ippodromo del Galoppo in 1992.
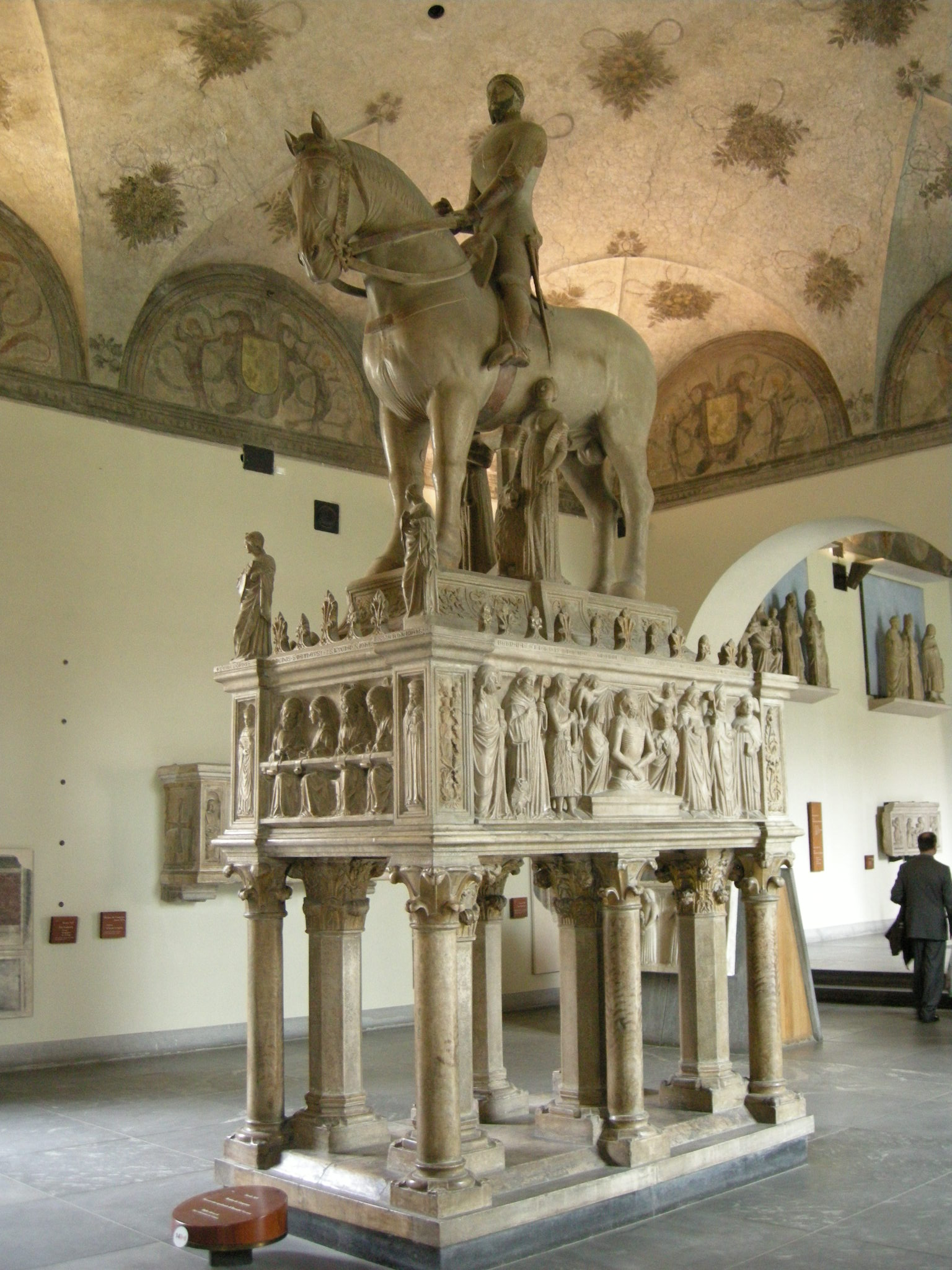
Bernabò Visconti in Castello Sforzesco

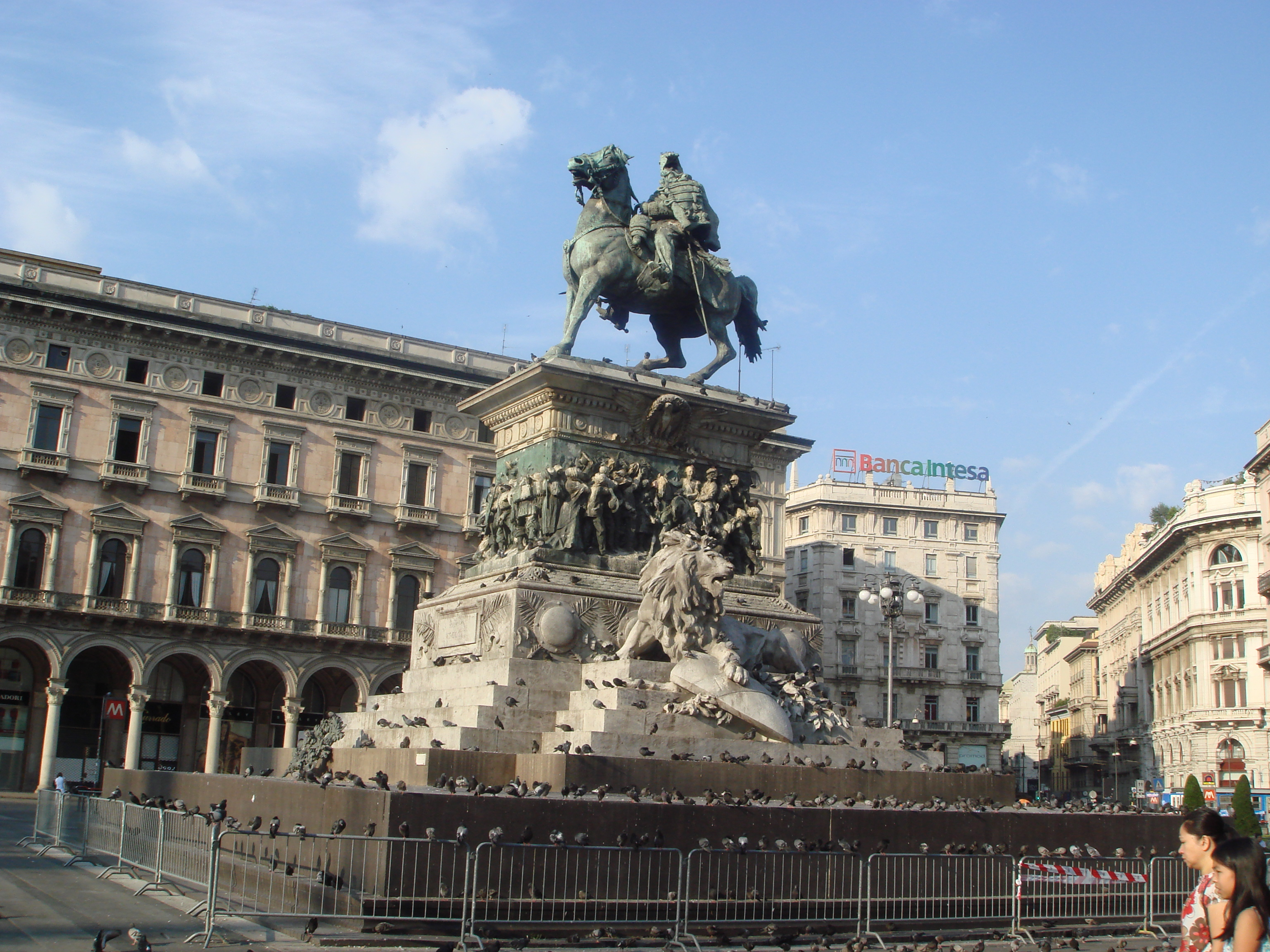
Victor Emmanuel II at Piazza del Duomo

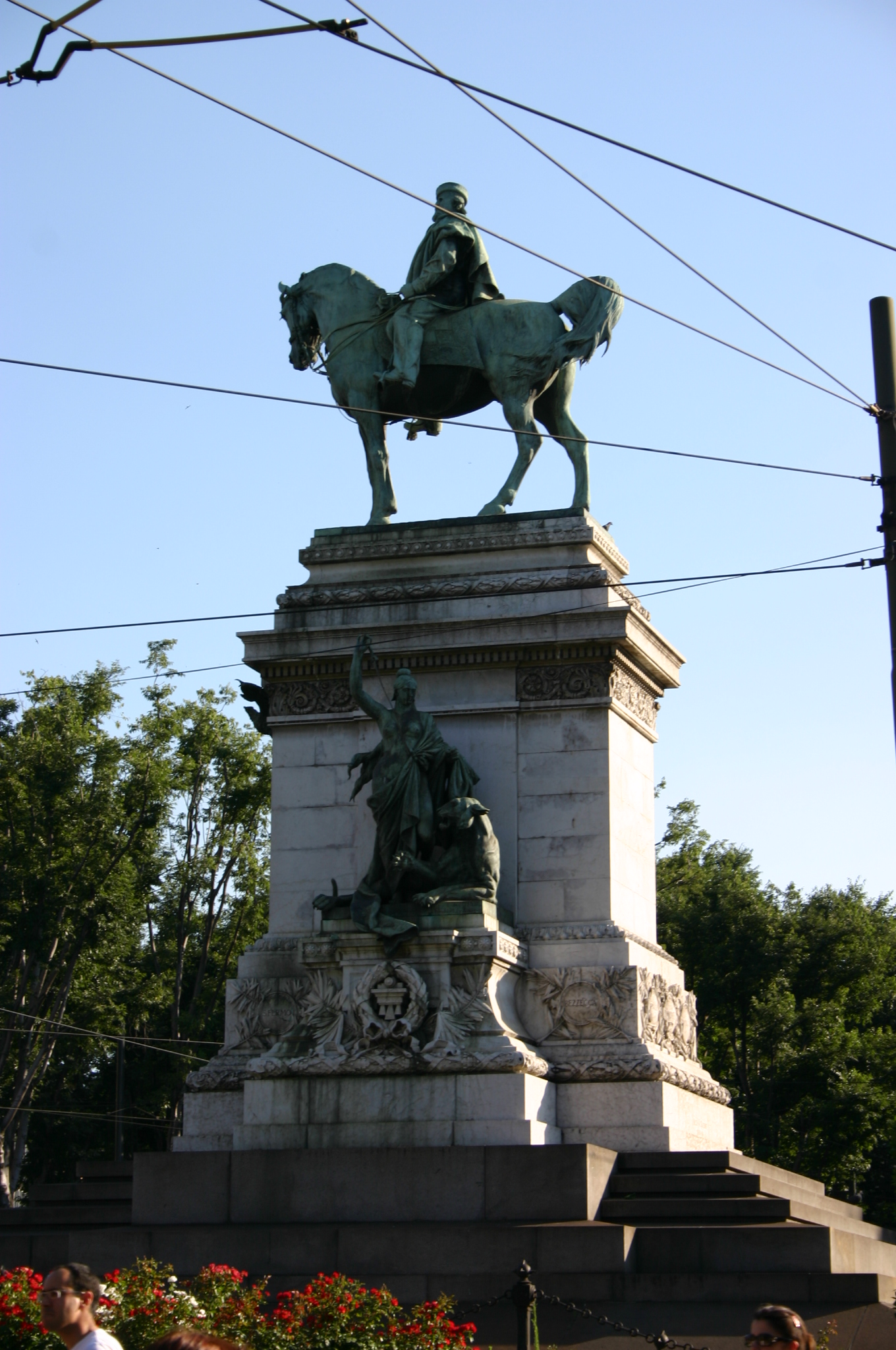
Giuseppe Garibaldi at Piazzale Carioli ("Piazza Castello")

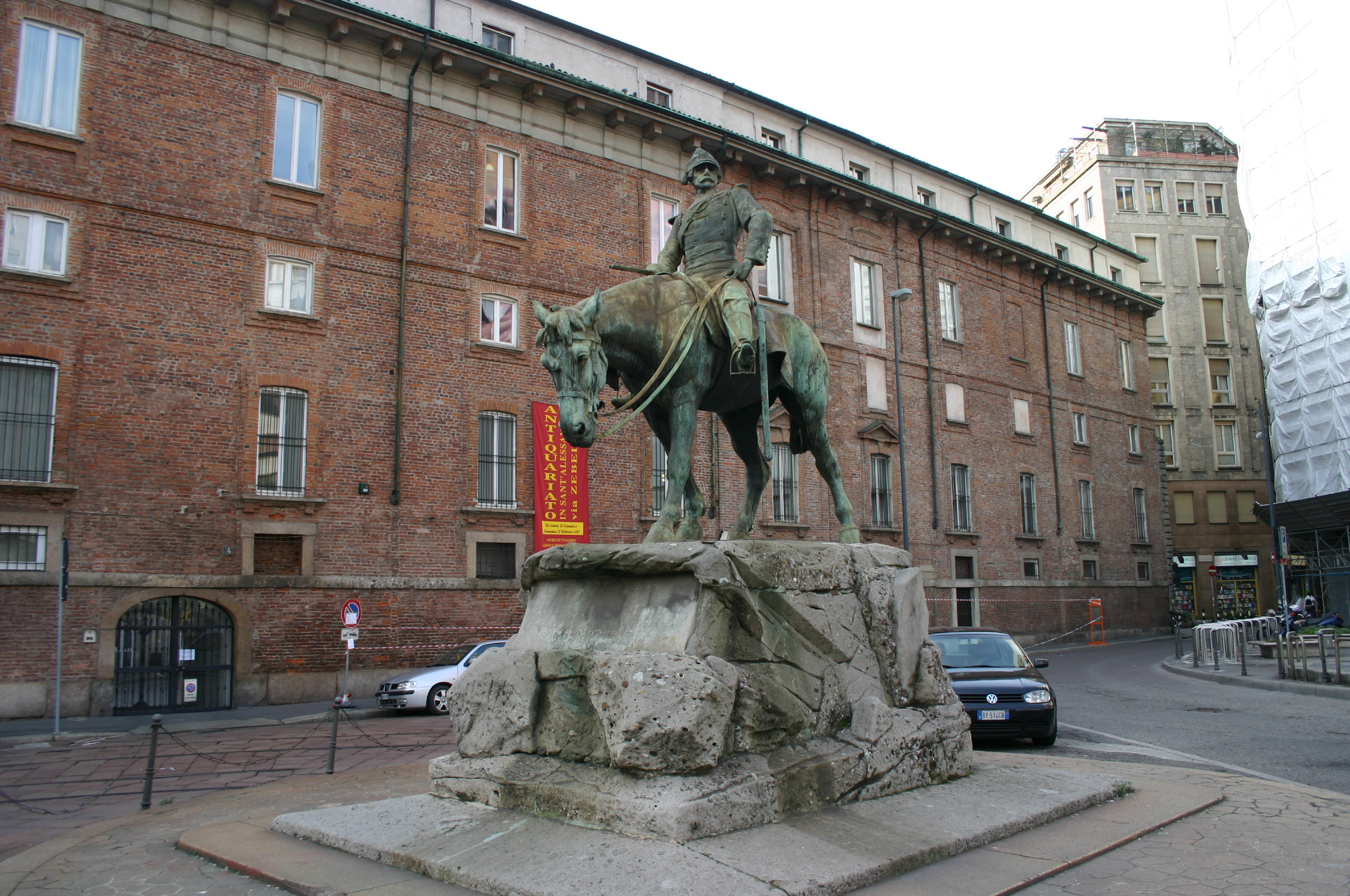
Giuseppe Missori at Piazza Missori

== Naples ==
- Equestrian of Victor Emmanuel II at the Piazza Municipio.
- Equestrian of King Carlo III di Borbone (Carlo III) at the Piazza del Plebiscito.
- Equestrian of King Ferdinando I delle Due Sicilie at the Piazza del Plebiscito.
- Equestrian of General Armando Diaz in the via Caracciolo.
- Equestrian of Marcus Nonius Balbus, in the Naples National Archaeological Museum
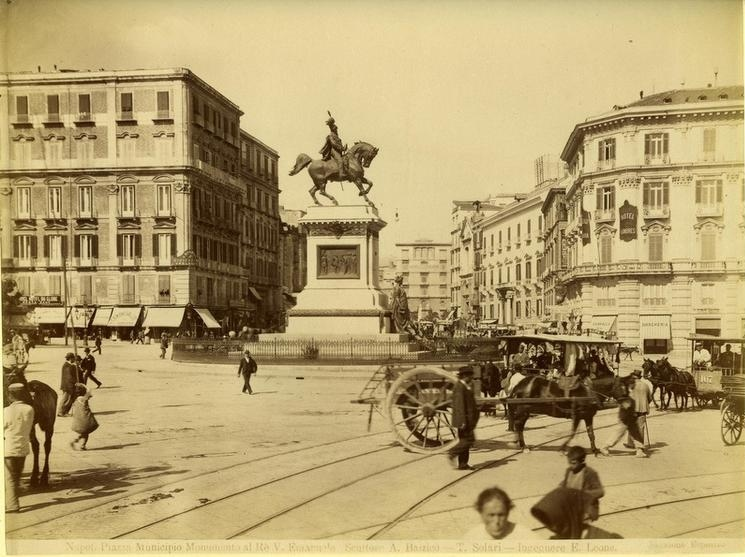
Victor Emmanuel II

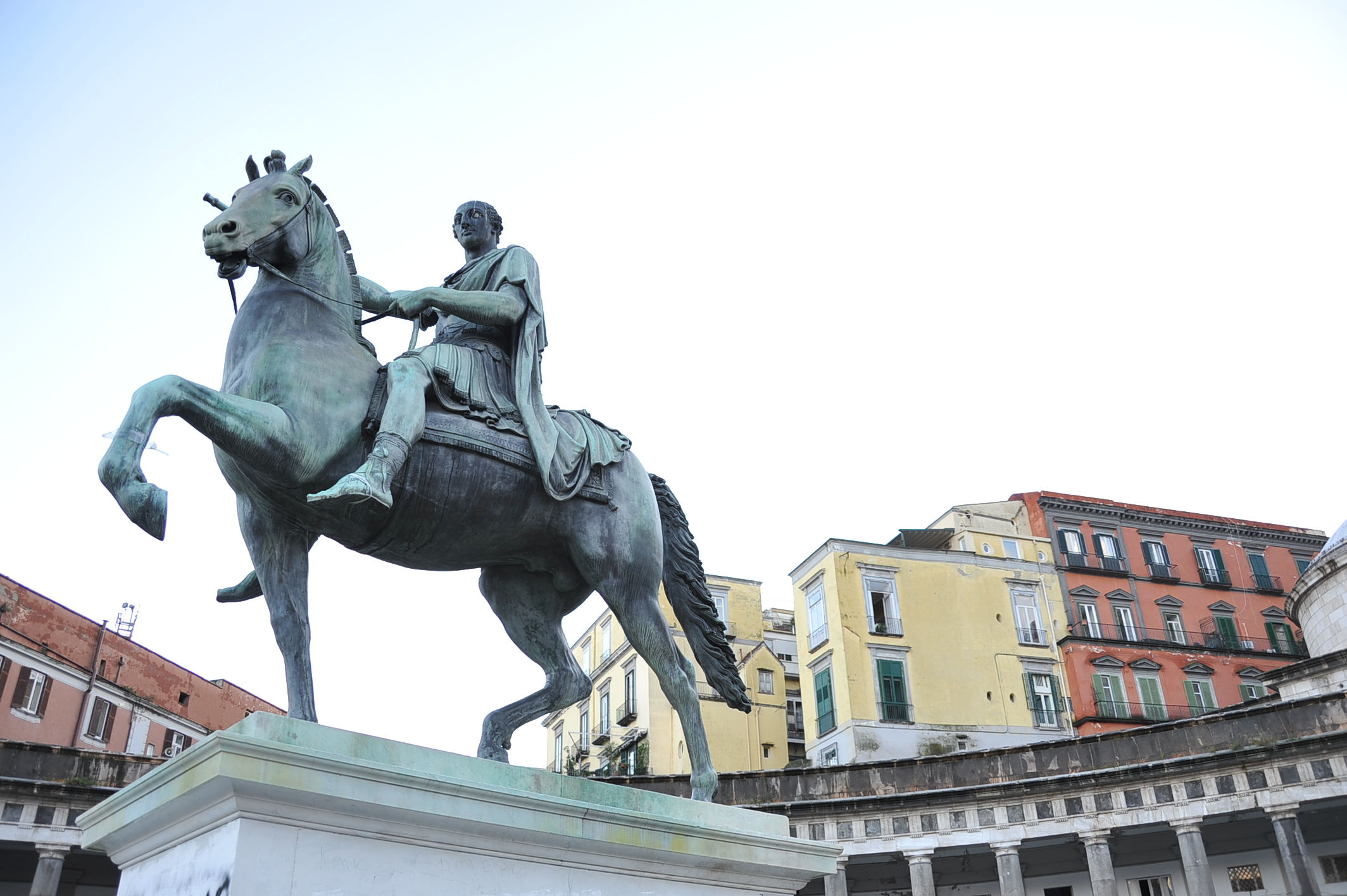
King Carlo III di Borbone at the Piazza del Plebiscito

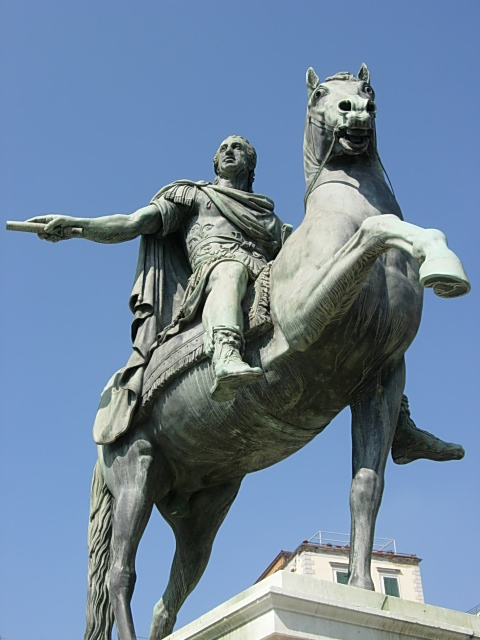
King Ferdinando I delle Due Sicilie at the Piazza del Plebiscito

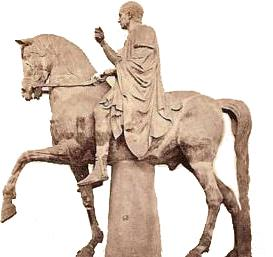
Marcus Nonius Balbus

== Padua ==
- Donatello's Gattamelata (1453) on the piazza in front of the Basilica of Saint Anthony. It was the first full-size equestrian bronze cast since antiquity.
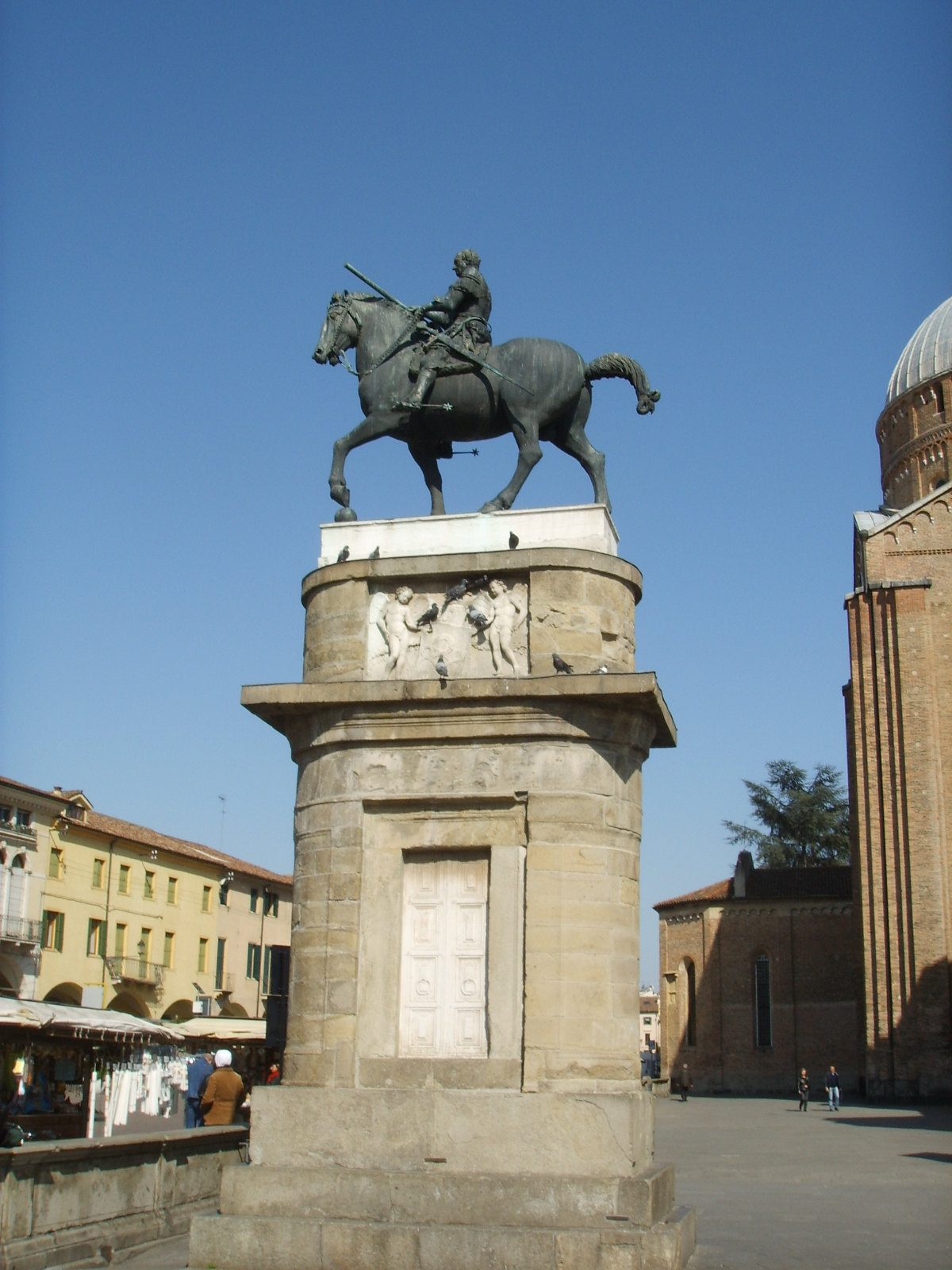
Gattamelata in Padua

== Perugia ==
- Equestrian of Victor Emmanuel II.
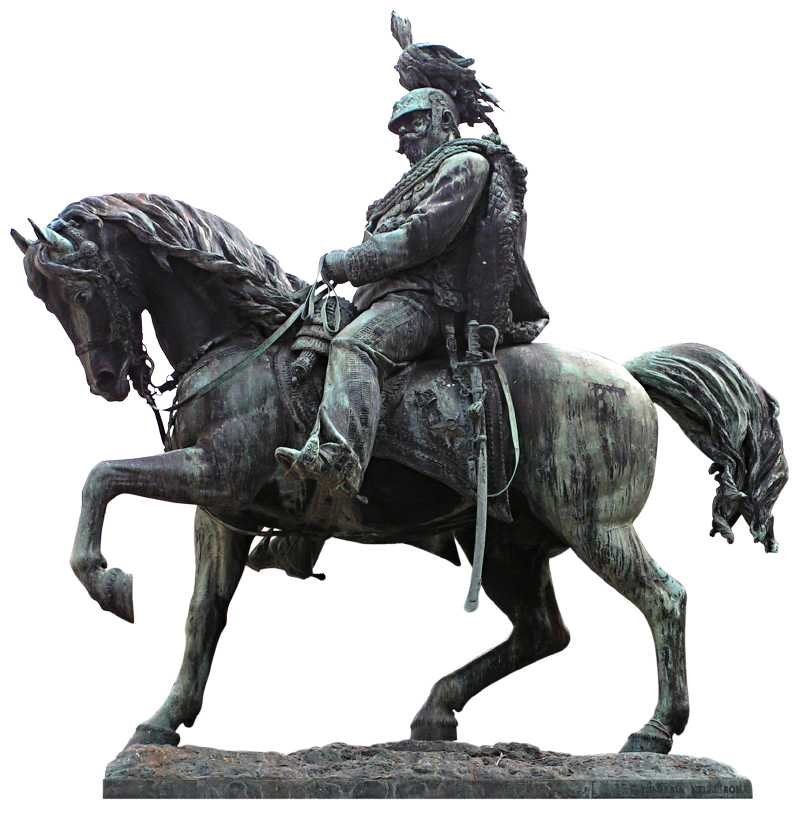
Victor Emmanuel II in Perugia

== Piacenza ==
- Francesco Mochi's monument to Ranuccio II Farnese (1620) at the Piazza dei Cavalli (Horses' Square).
- Francesco Mochi's monument to Alessandro Farnese (1629) at the Piazza dei Cavalli (Horses' Square).
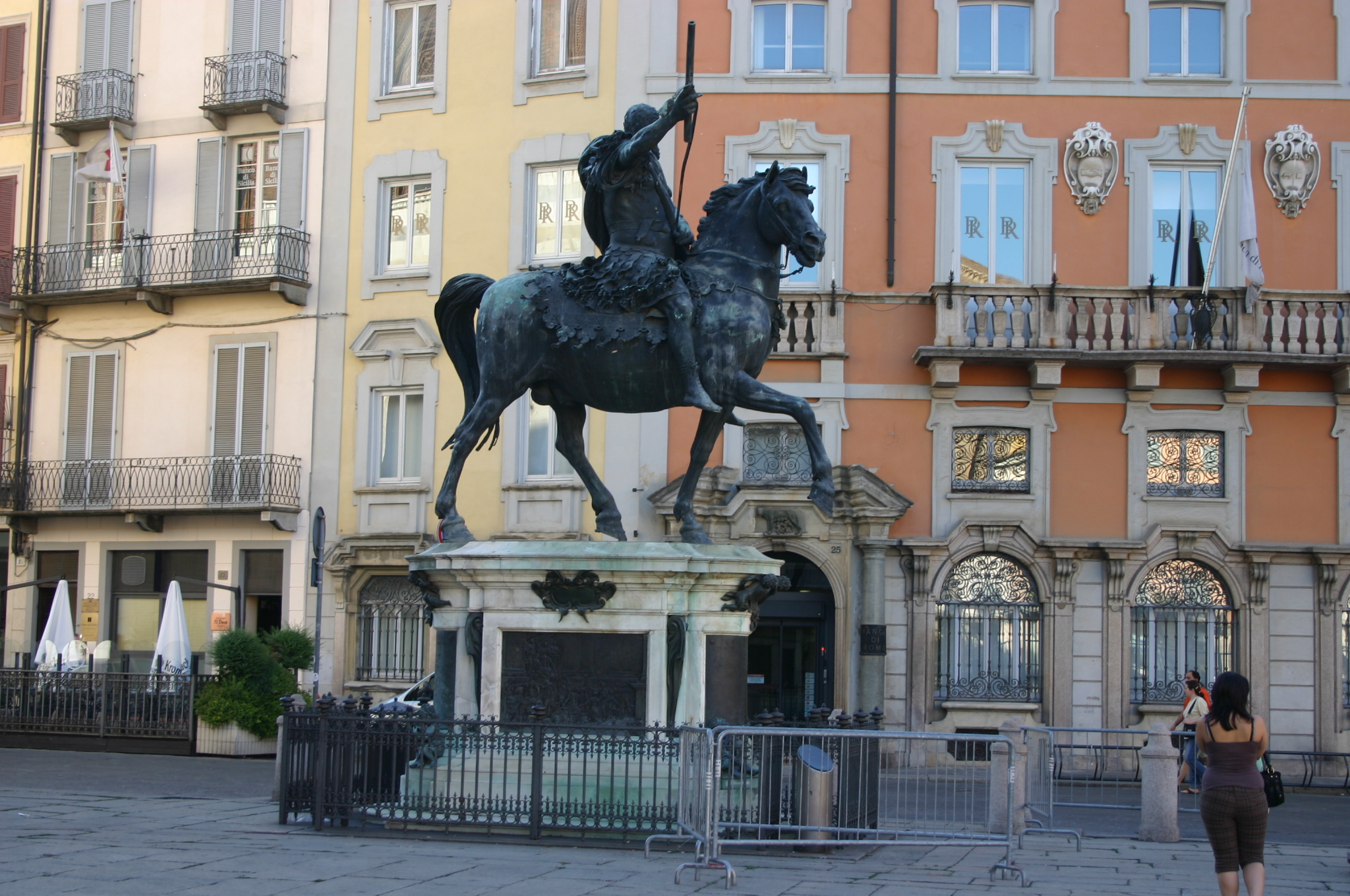
Ranuccio II Farnese in Piacenza

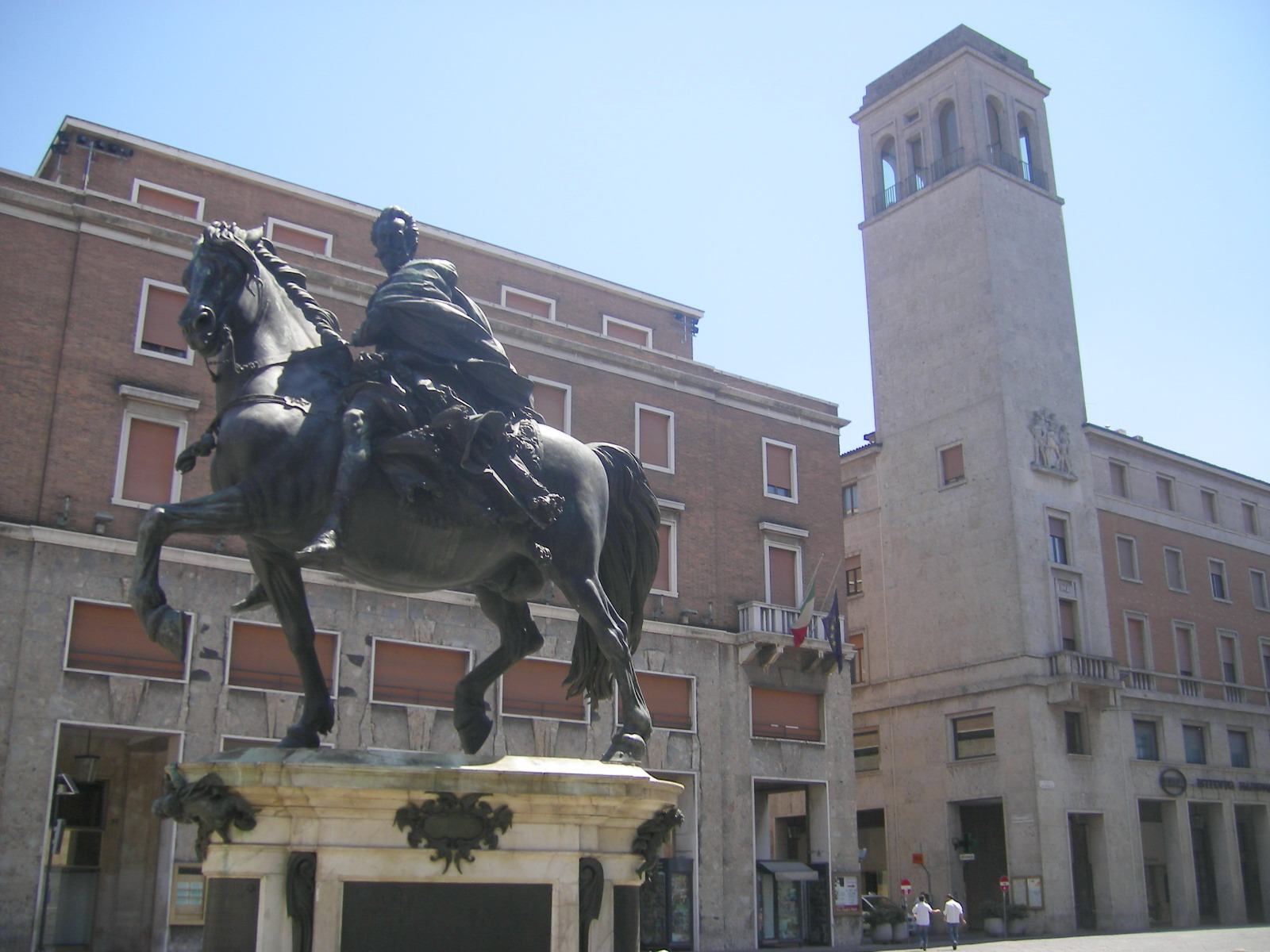
Alessandro Farnese in Piacenza

== Pistoia ==
- Equestrian statue of Giuseppe Garibaldi
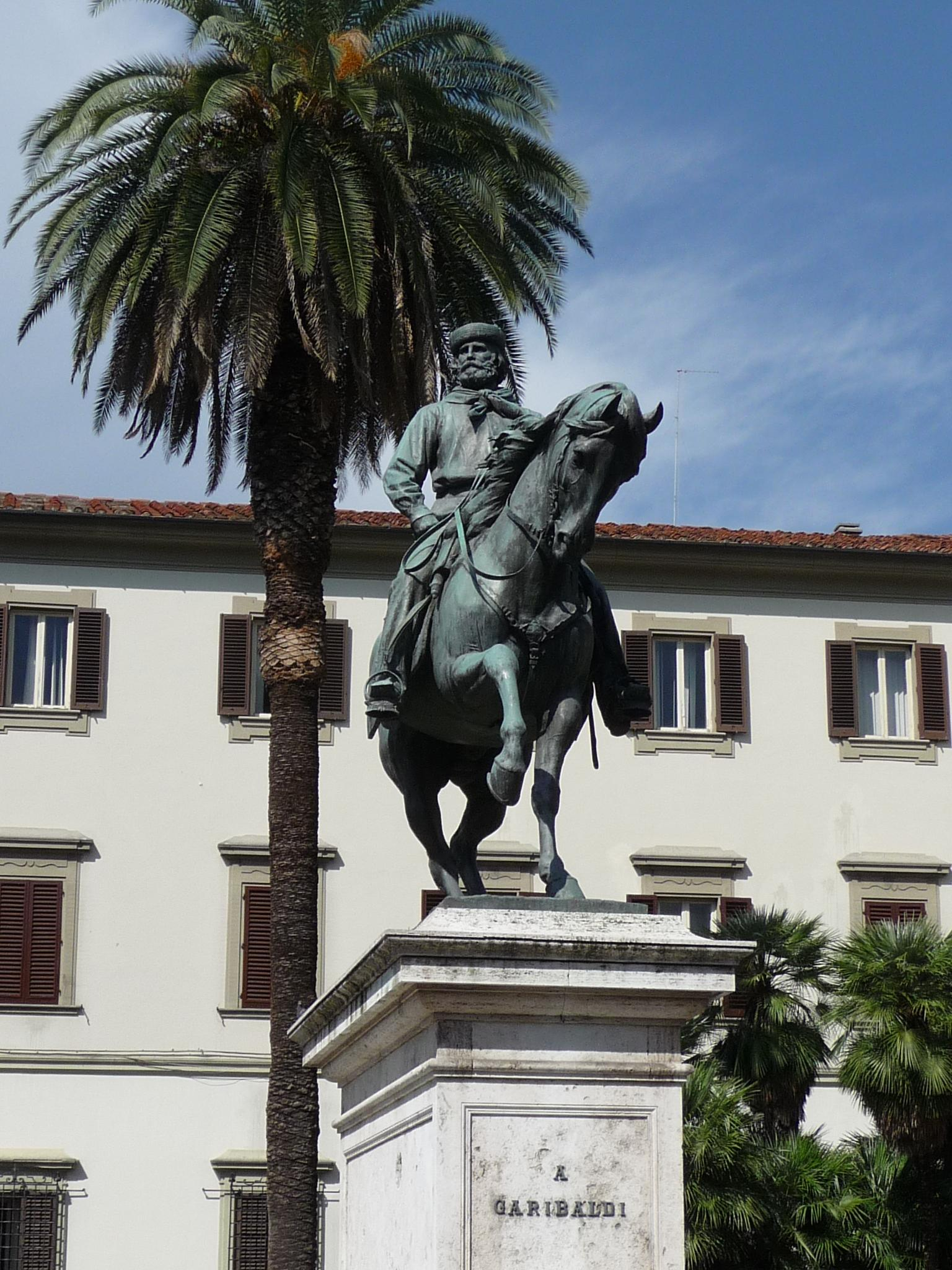

== Ponte Gardena ==
- Al Genio del Fascismo by G. Gori, renamed Al Genio del Lavoratore Italiano in 1945, 1938 (destroyed in 1961).

== Rovigo ==
- Equestrian monument to Giuseppe Garibaldi by Ettore Ferrari, at Piazza Giuseppe Garibaldi
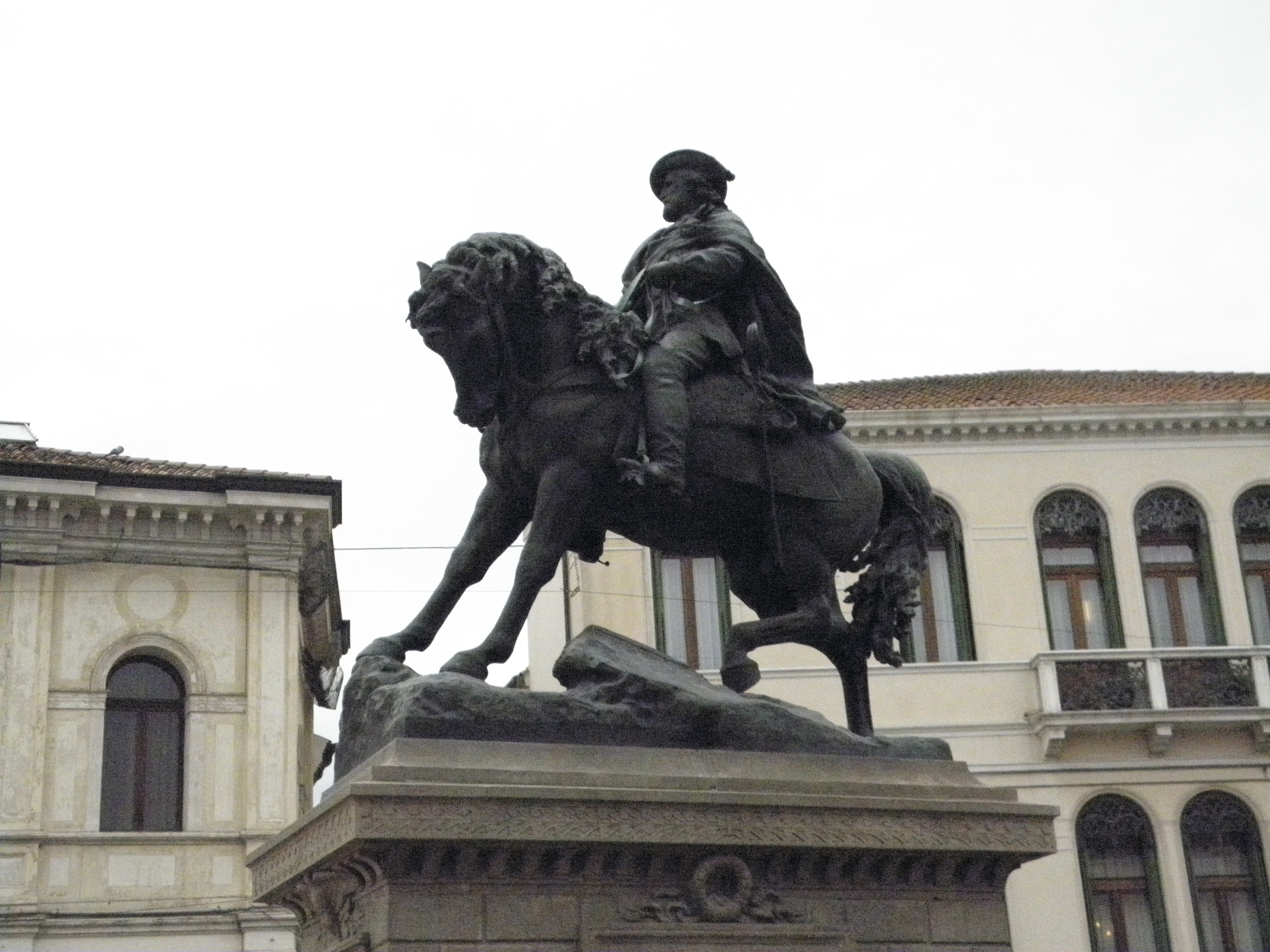
Giuseppe Garibaldi at Piazza Giuseppe Garibaldi

== Savona ==
- Equestrian monument to Giuseppe Garibaldi by Leonardo Bistolfi, 1912–1928
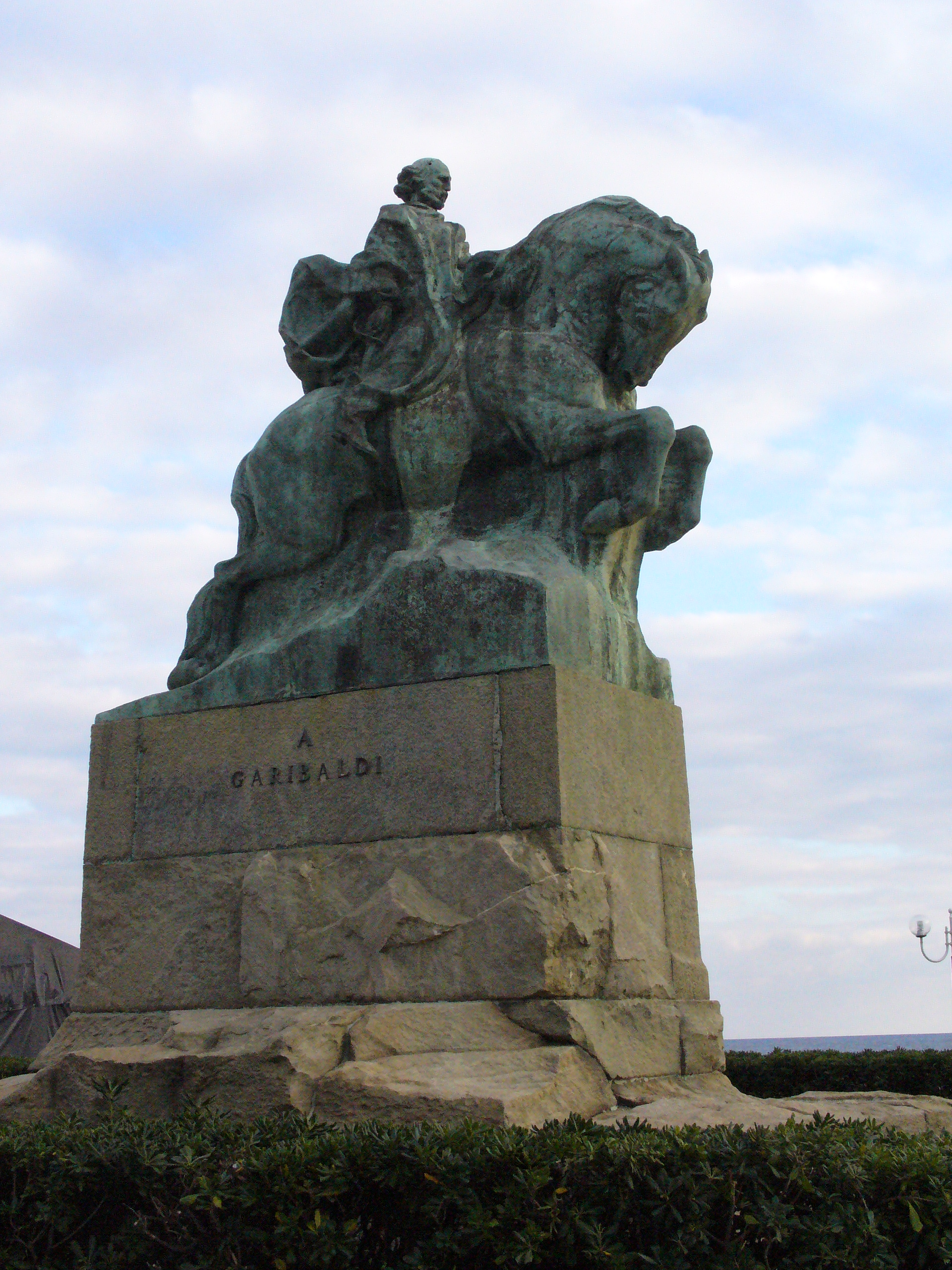
Giuseppe Garibaldi

== Turin ==
- Equestrian of Duke Emanuele Filiberto, at Piazza San Carlo
- Two equestrian statues of the Dioscuri (Castor and Pollux), by Abbondio Sangiorgio, at the Palazzo Reale
- Equestrian of King Carlo Alberto by Carlo Marocchetti, at Piazza Carlo Alberto
- Equestrian statue of Alfonso La Marmora, at Piazza Bodoni
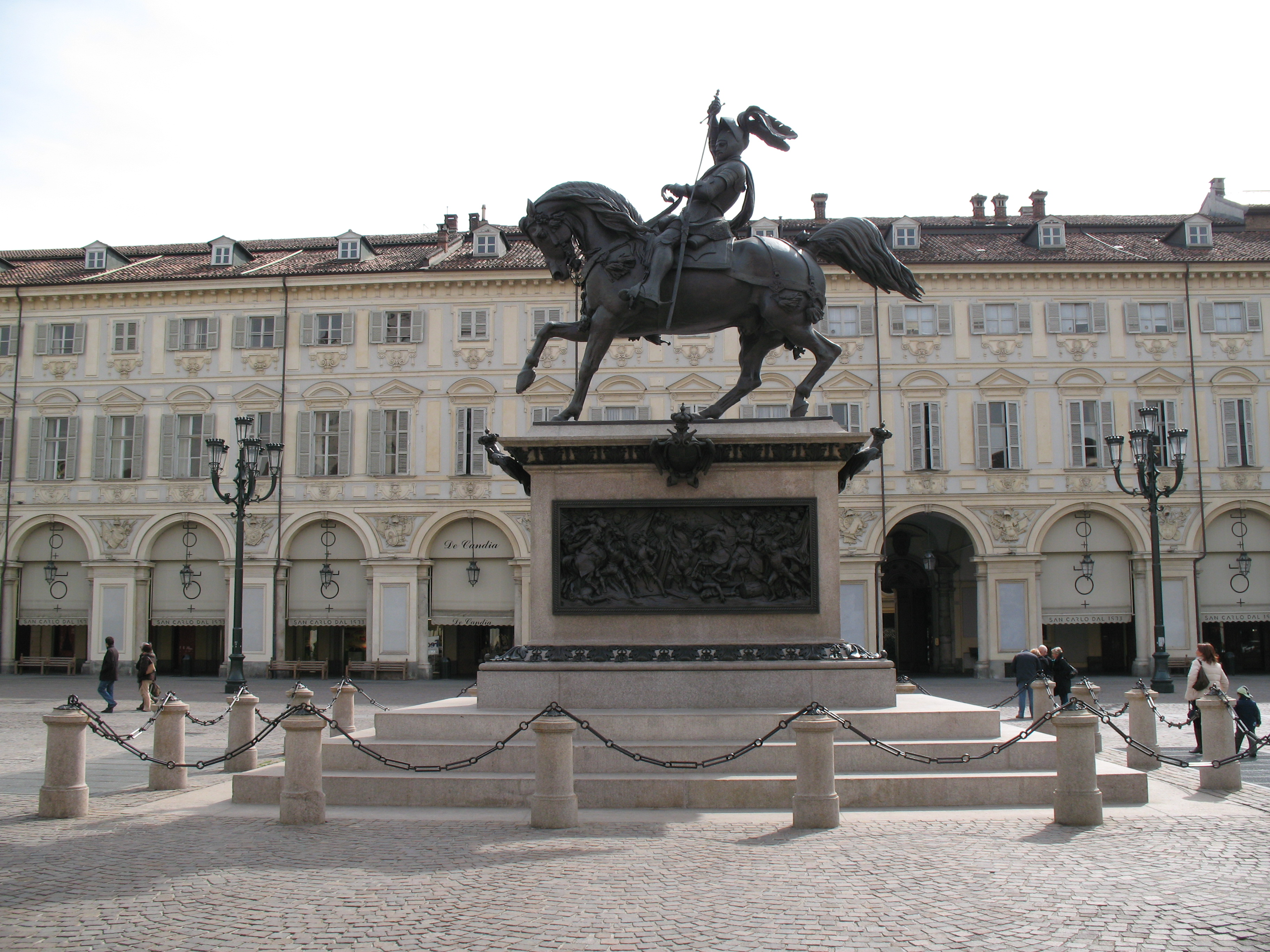
Duke Emanuele Filiberto at Piazza San Carlo

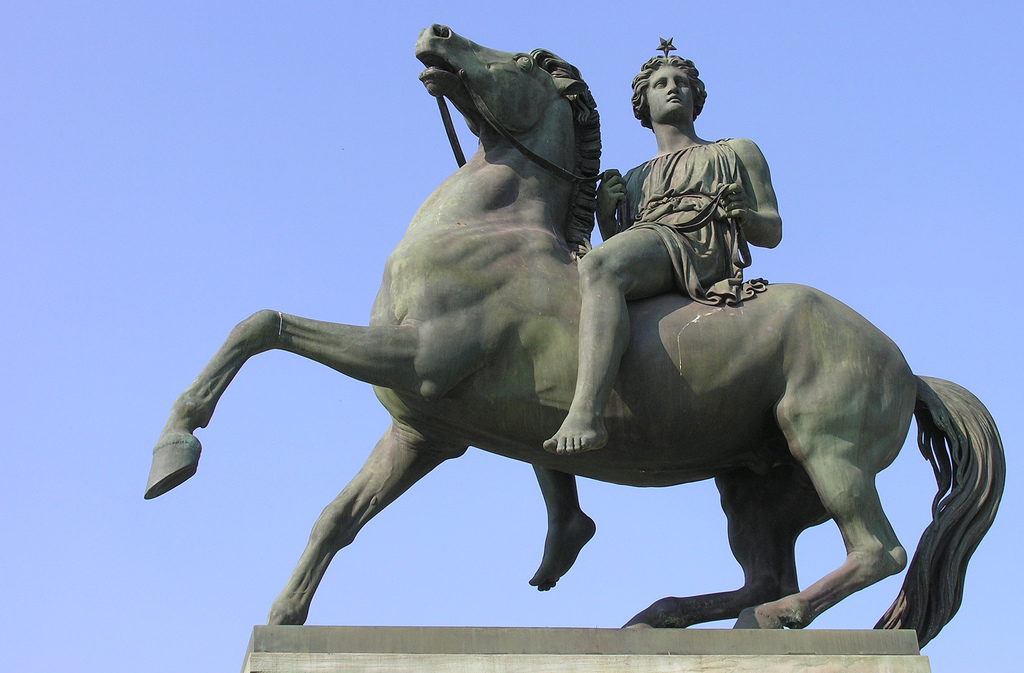
Pollux at Palazzo Reale

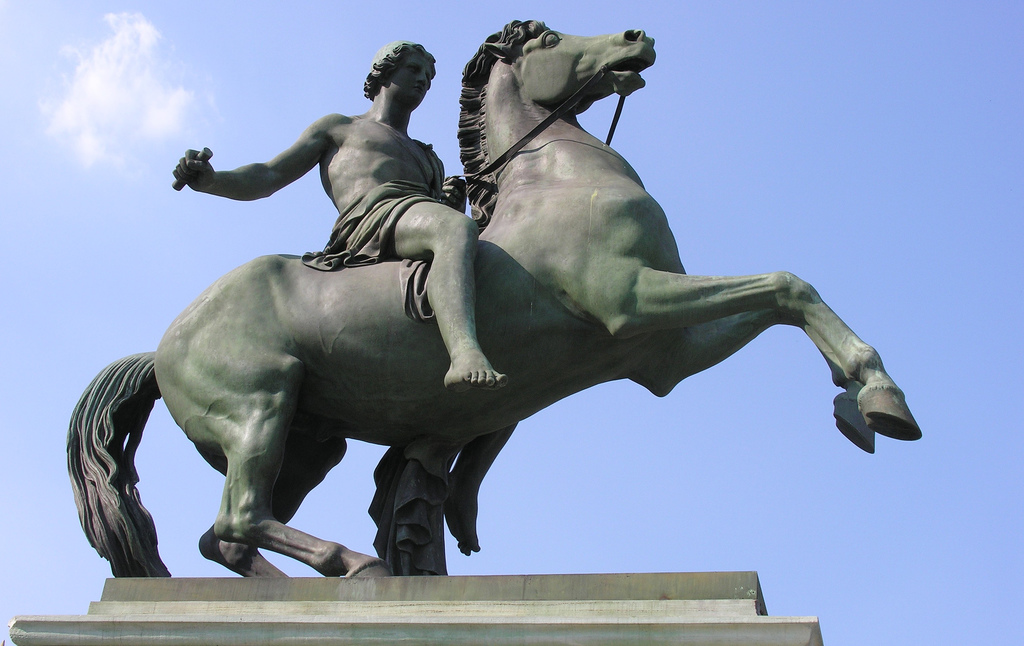
Castor at Palazzo Reale

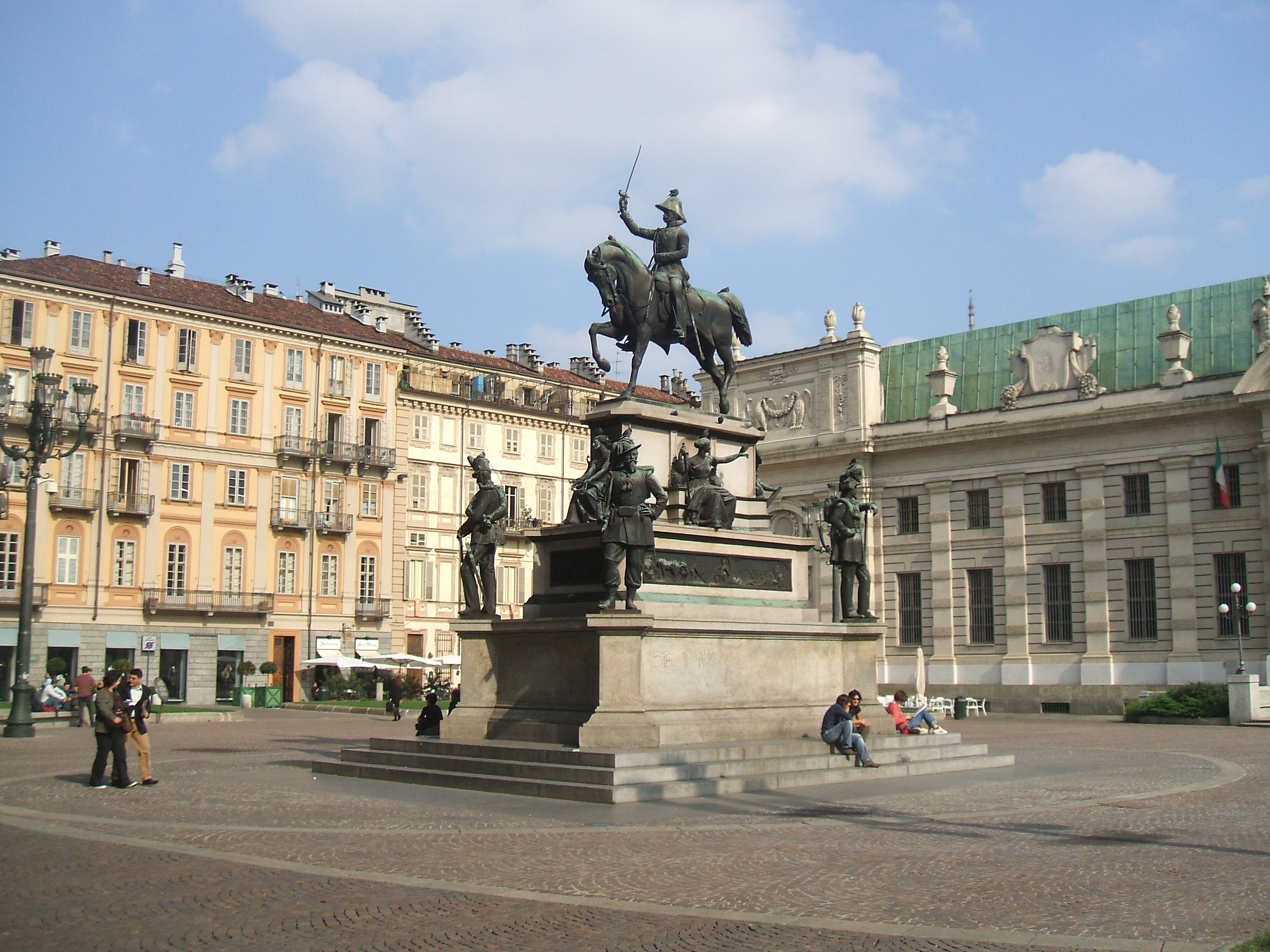
King Carlo Alberto at Piazza Carlo Alberto

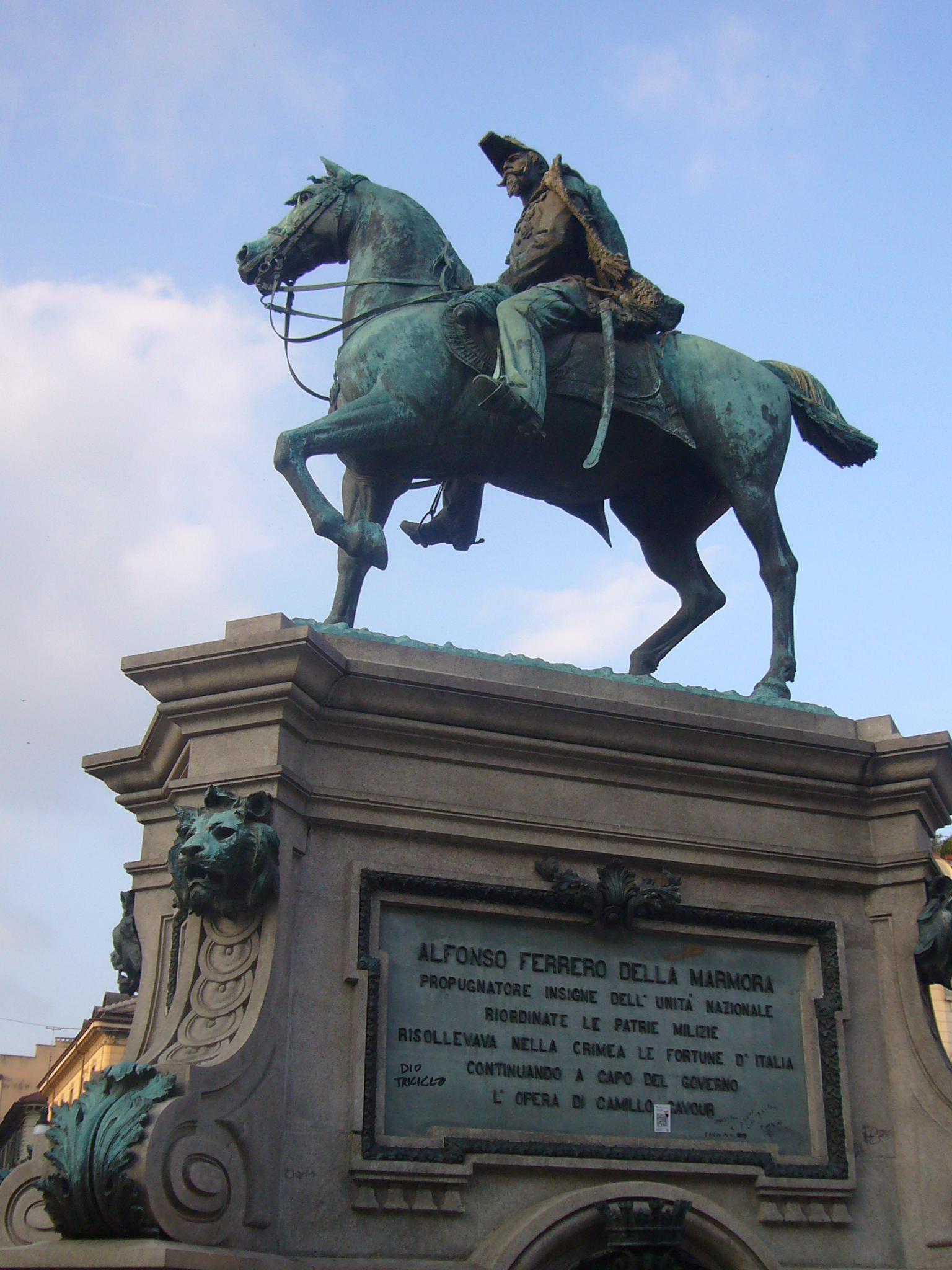
Alfonso La Marmora at Piazza Bodoni

== Venice ==
- Bartolomeo Colleoni by Verrocchio on the Campo dei santi Giovanni e Paolo square.
- Equestrian of Monument to Victor Emmanuel II by Ettore Ferrari on the Riva degli Schiavoni, 1887.
- Golden statue on the tomb Domenico Contarini (died 1526), in Santo Stefano church, 1650.
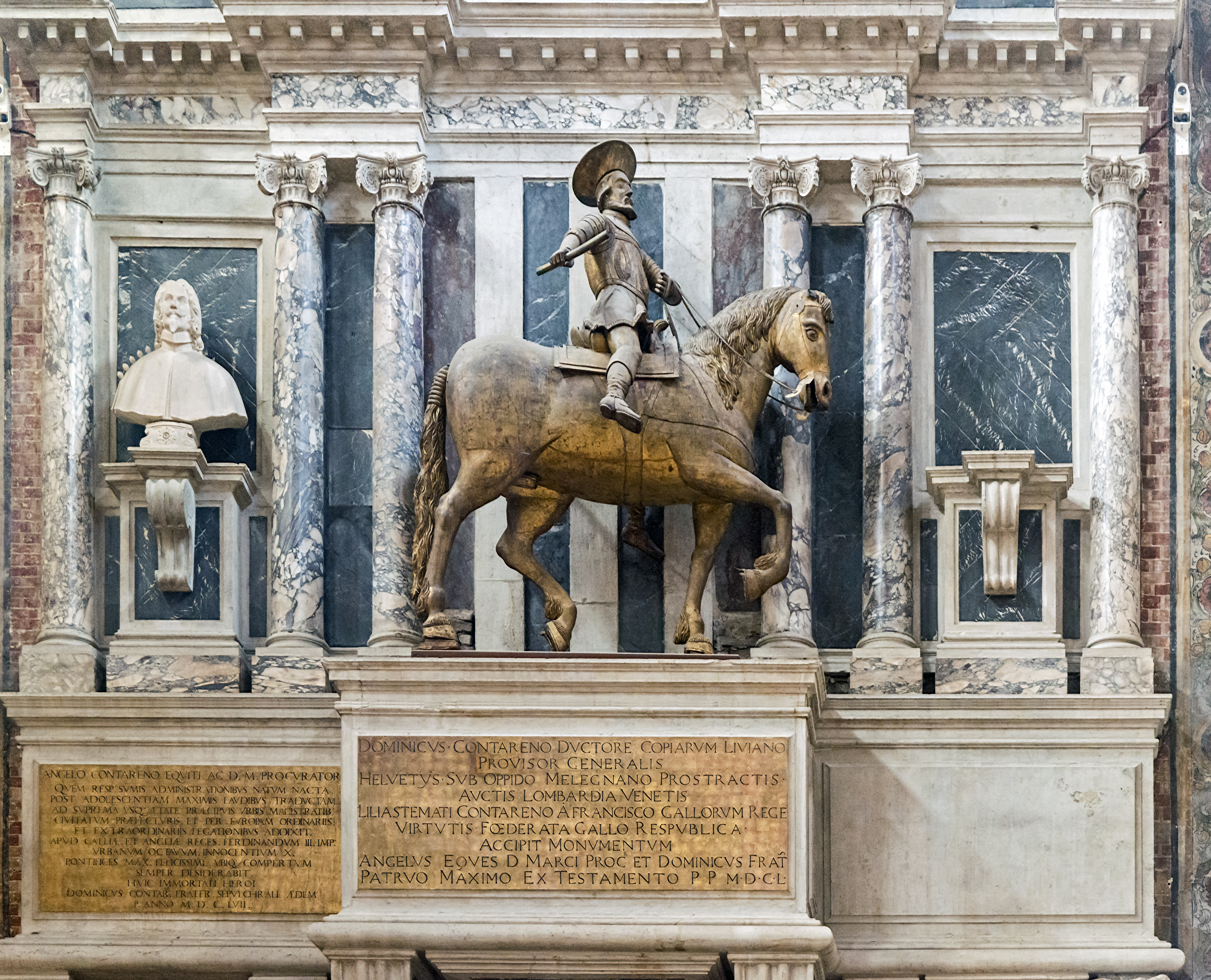
Domenico Contarini

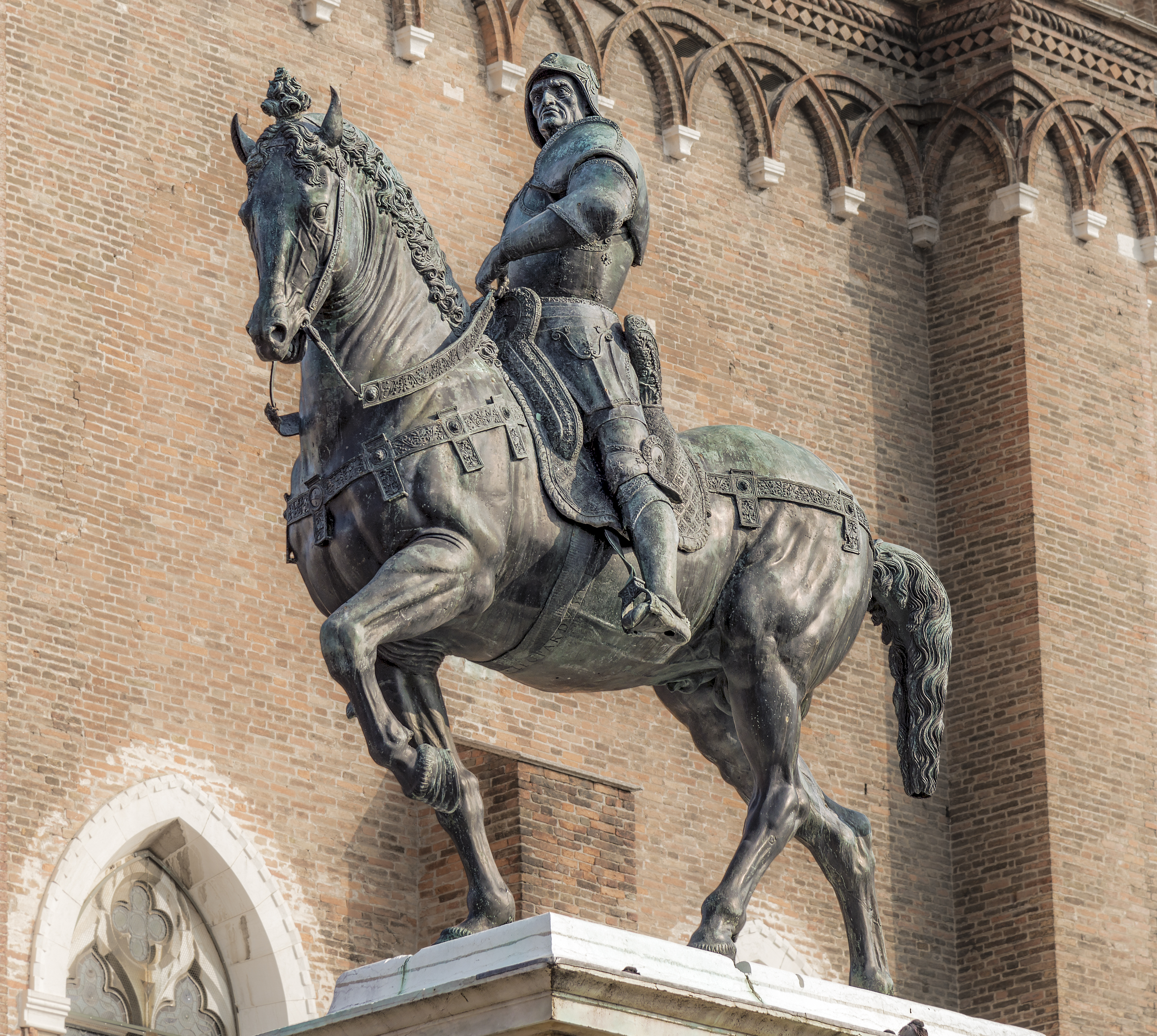
Bartolomeo Colleoni in Venice

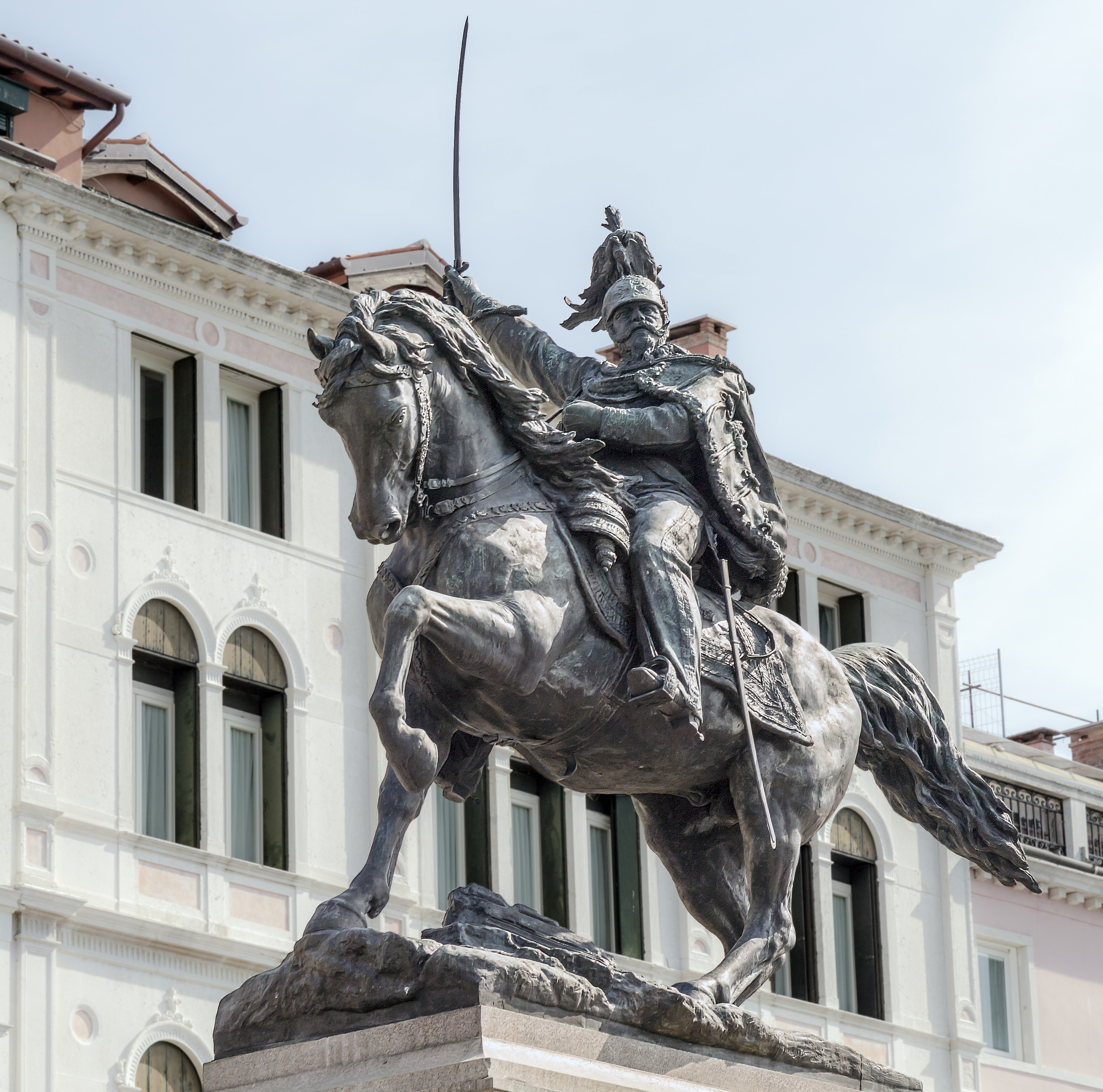
Monument to Victor Emmanuel II in Venice

== Verona ==
- Equestrian statues from the Scaliger Tombs, now at the Castelvecchio Museum:
  - Cangrande I della Scala
  - Mastino II della Scala
- Equestrian of Cangrande I della Scala, copy at the Scaliger Tombs
- Equestrian of Cansignorio della Scala
- Equestrian of Victor Emmanuel II at the Piazza Bra
- Monument to Giuseppe Garibaldi by Pietro Bordini, at Piazza Indipendenza, 1887
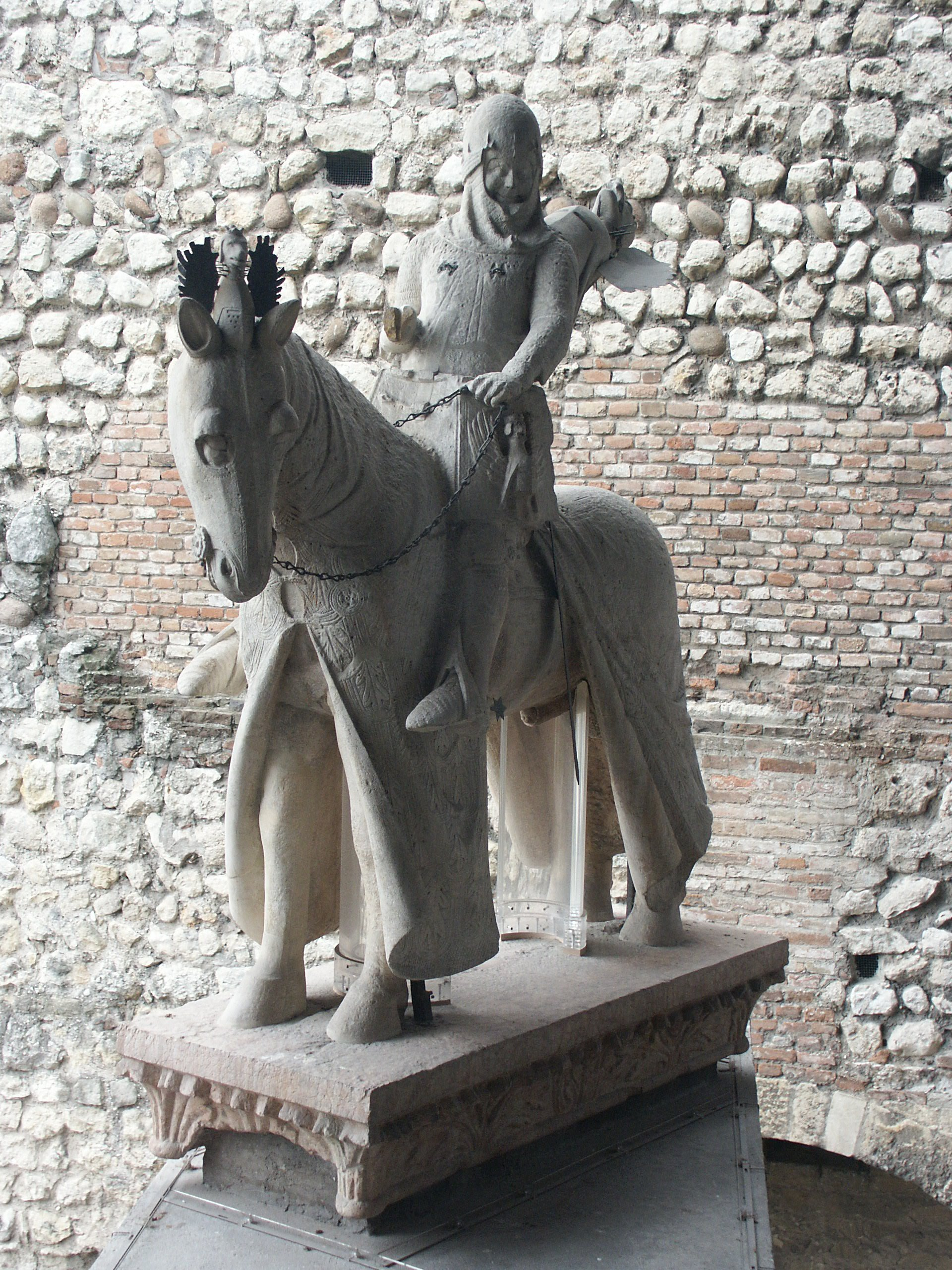
Cangrande della Scala at Castelvecchio Museum

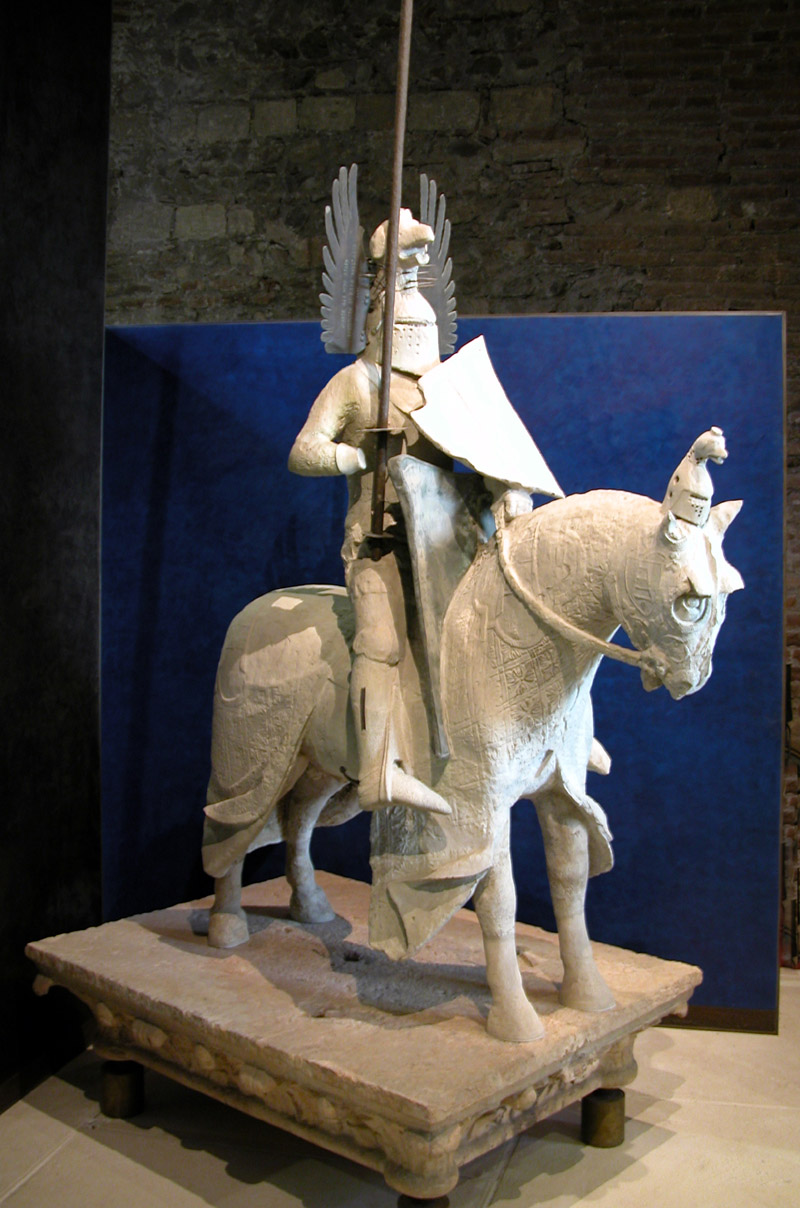
Mastino II della Scala at Castelvecchio Museum

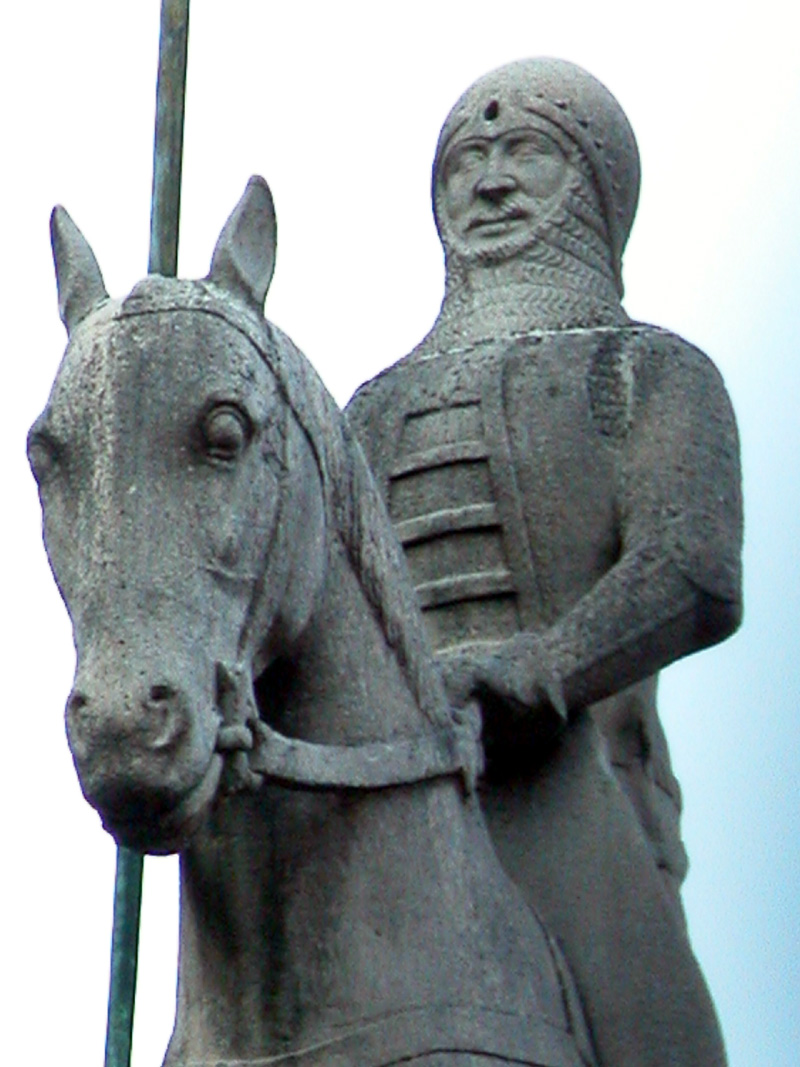
Cansignorio della Scala

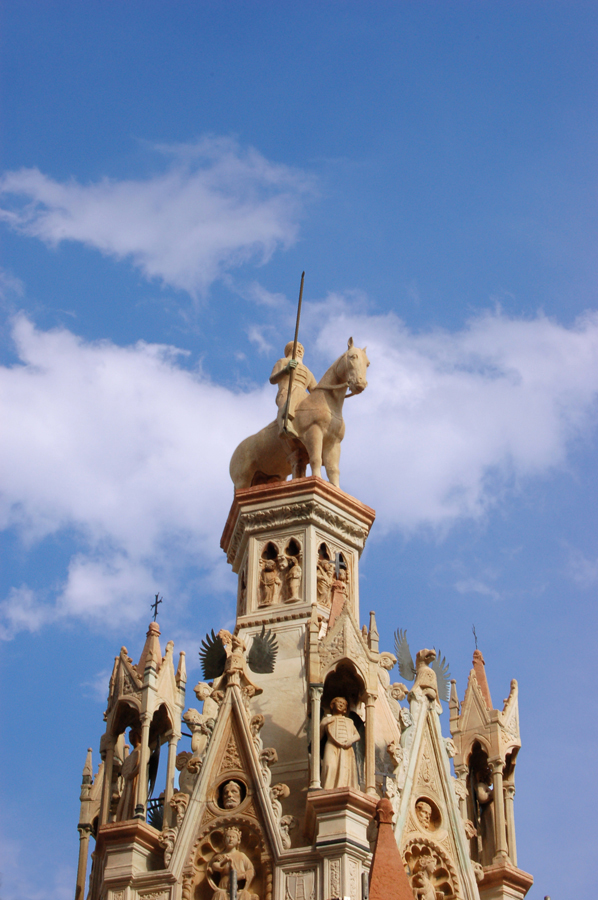
Cangrande della Scala at the Scaliger Tombs

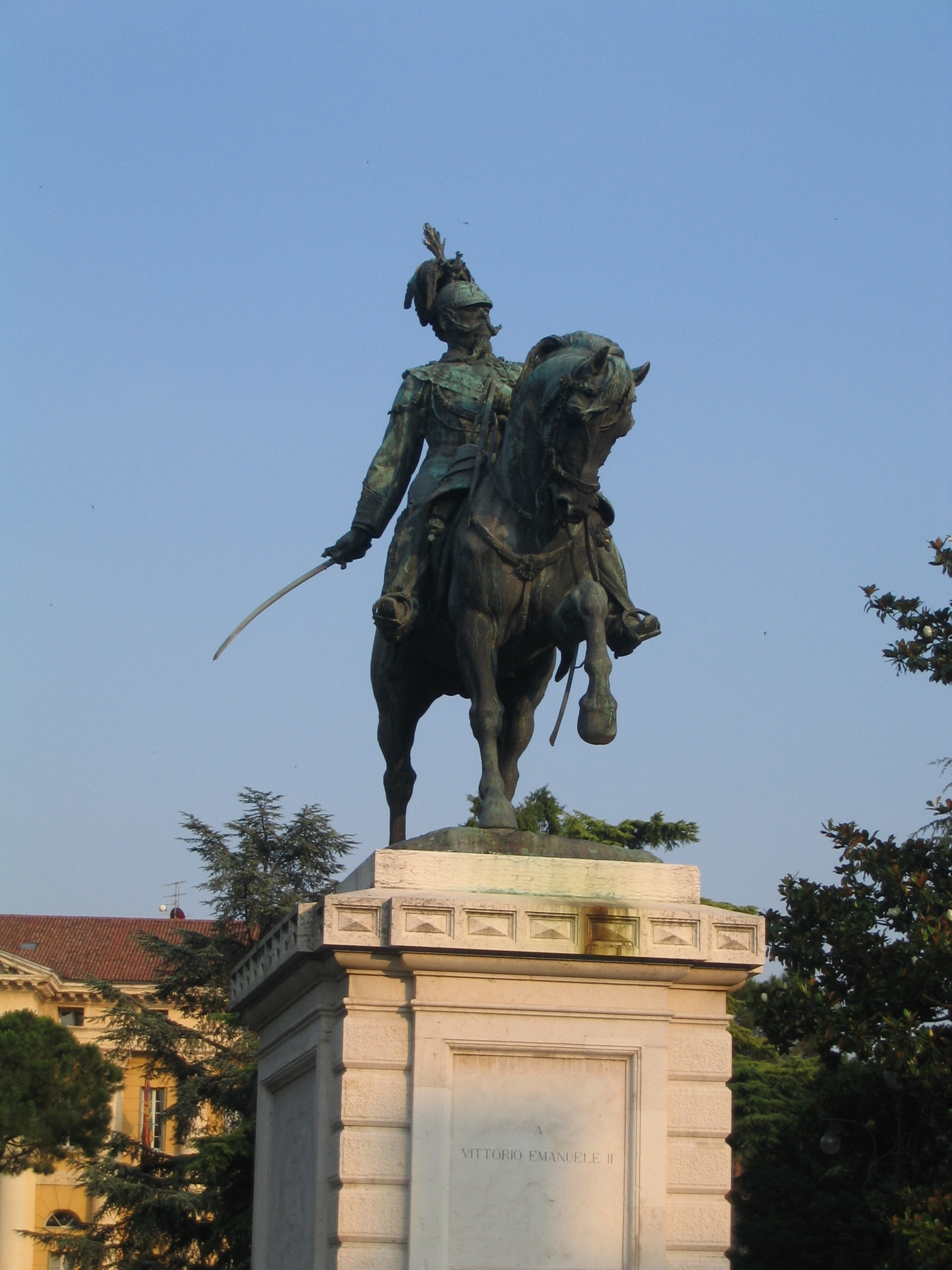
Victor Emmanuel II at Piazza Bra

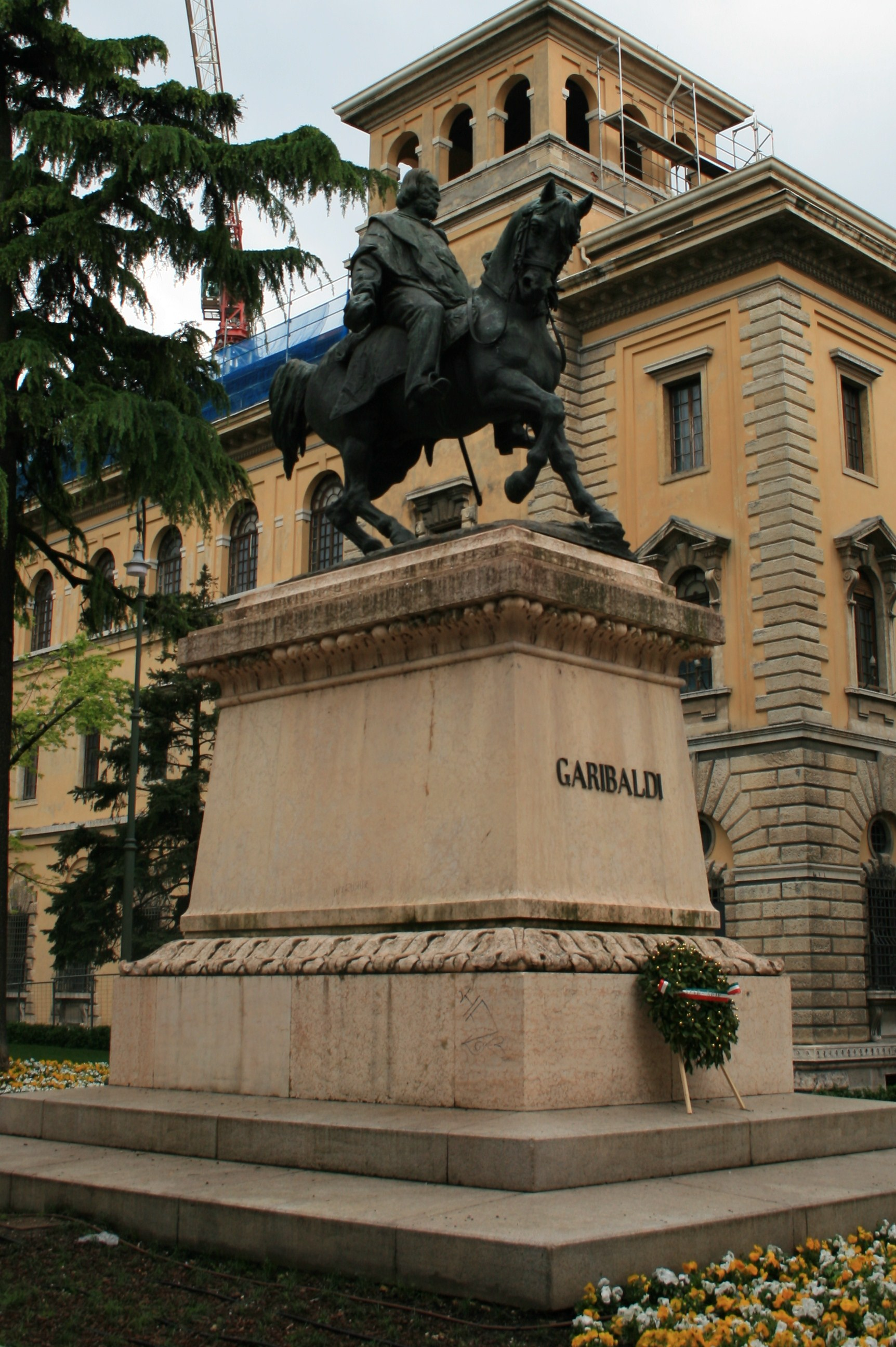
Giuseppe Garibaldi at Piazza Indipendenza
