= White-ground technique =

Greek pottery style

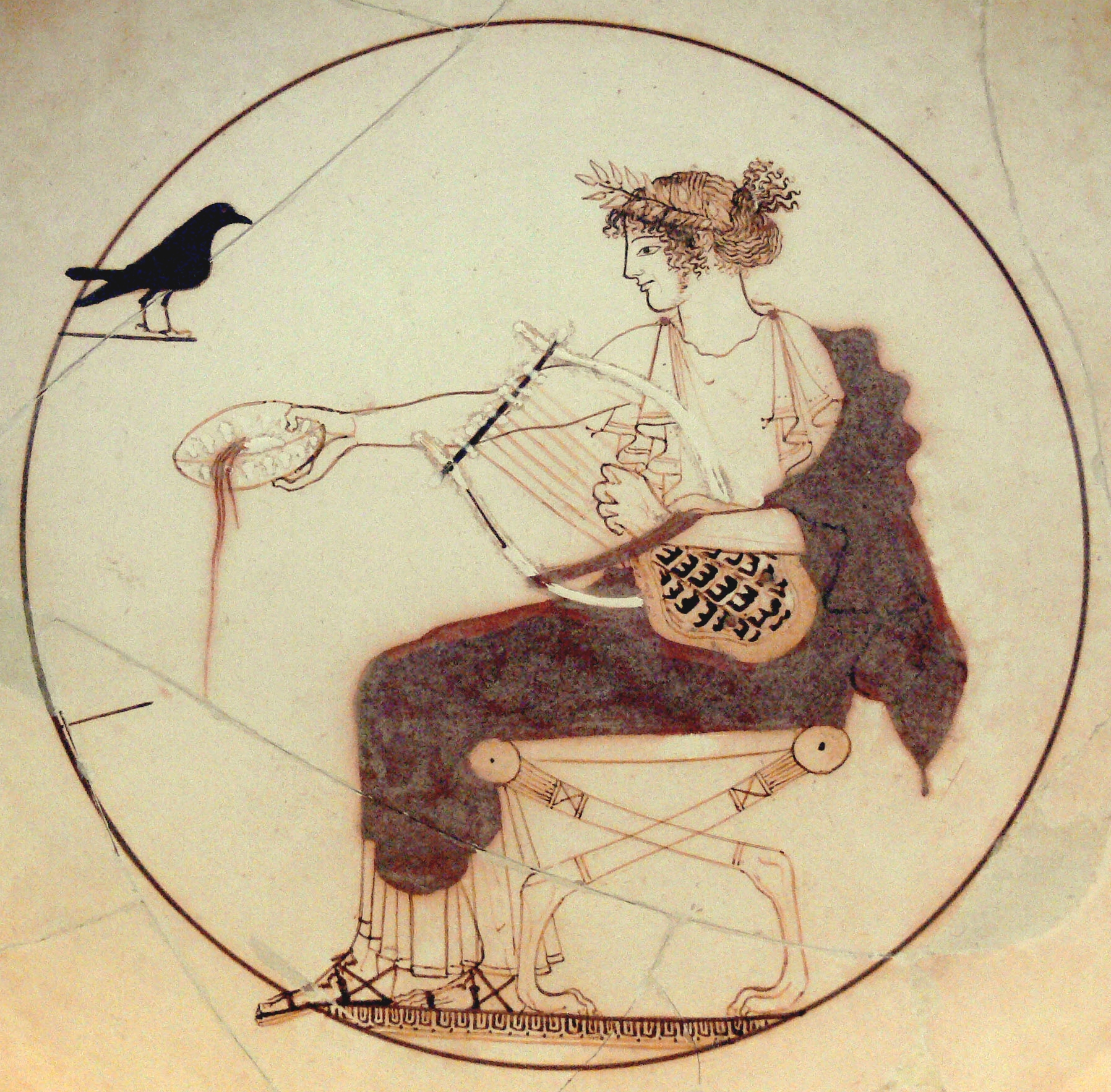
Kylix of Apollo, Attic, c. 460 BC. Apollo pours a libation, detail.

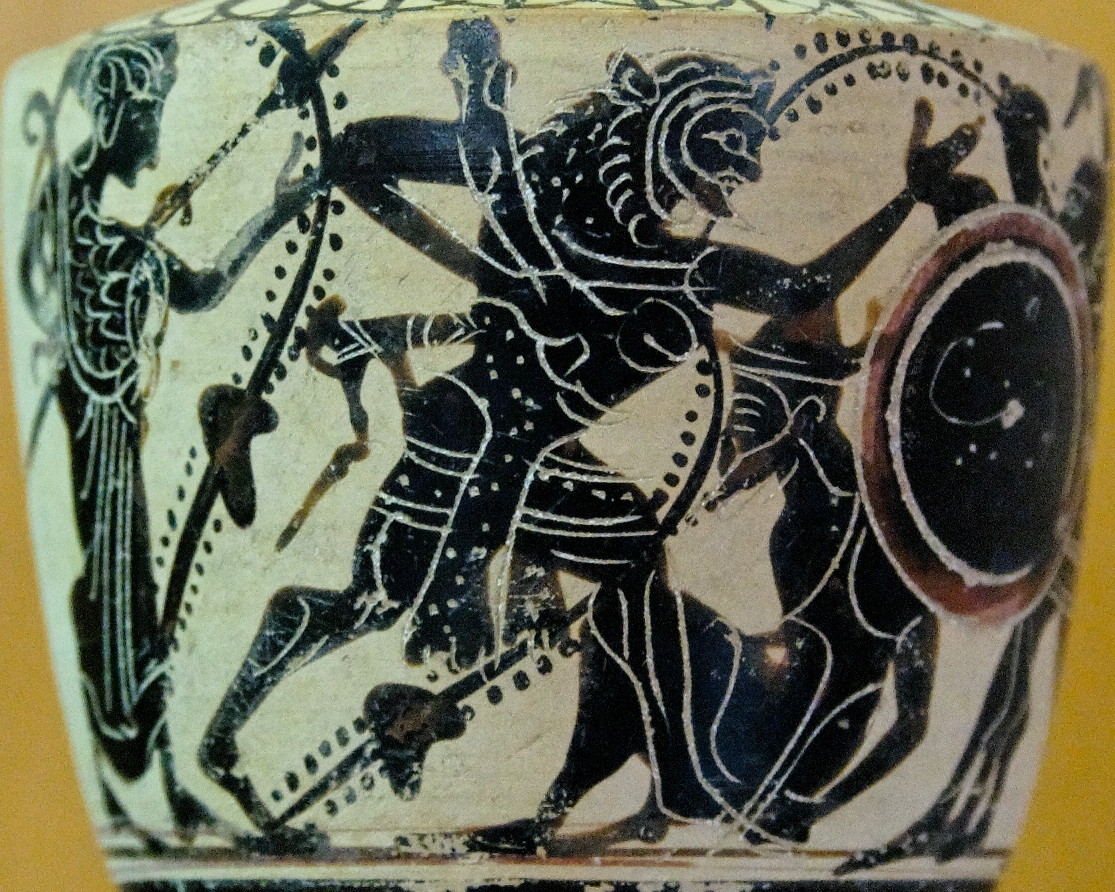
Attic white-ground lekythos (type I) depicting Heracles fighting Geryon, Antonino Salinas Regional Archaeological Museum, Palermo

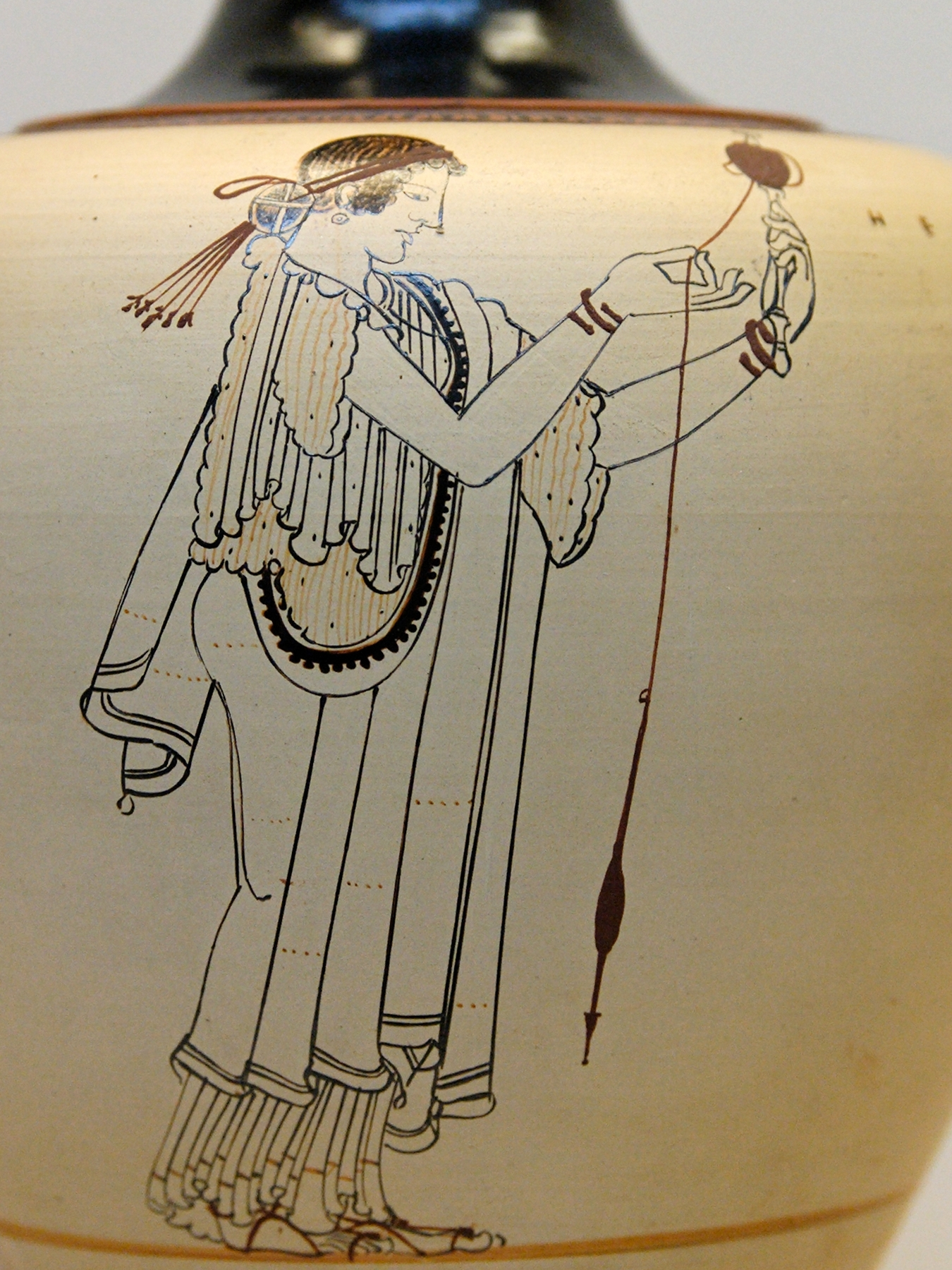
Spinning woman, Attic oinochoe (type III), probably from Locri, by the Brygos Painter, c. 490 BC

White-ground technique is a style of white ancient Greek pottery and the painting in which figures appear on a white background. It developed in the region of Attica, dated to about 500 BC. It was especially associated with vases made for ritual and funerary use, if only because the painted surface was more fragile than in the other main techniques of black-figure and red-figure vase painting. Nevertheless, a wide range of subjects are depicted.

== Technique and style ==
In white-ground pottery, the vase is covered with a light or white slip of kaolinite. A similar slip had been used as carrier for vase paintings in the Geometric and Archaic periods. White-ground vases were produced, for example, in Ionia, Laconia and on the Cycladic islands, but only in Athens did it develop into a veritable separate style beside black-figure and red-figure vase painting. For that reason, the term "white-ground pottery" or "white-ground vase painting" is usually used in reference to the Attic material only.

The light slip was probably meant to make the vases appear more valuable, perhaps by eliciting associations with ivory or marble. However, in no case was a vessel's entire surface covered in white slip. It has also been conjectured that this form of painting emerged in order to emulate the more prestigious medium of wall painting, but proof for this thesis has been elusive. Furthermore, the group of five Huge Lekythoi (c. 70–100 cm high) are covered entirely in white slip, which suggests an imitation of marble lekythoi for funerary purposes.

White-ground vase painting often occurred in association with red-figure vase painting. Especially typical of this are kylikes with a white-ground interior and a red-figure exterior image. White-ground painting is less durable than black- or red-figure, which is why such vases were primarily used as votives and grave vessels.

== Types ==
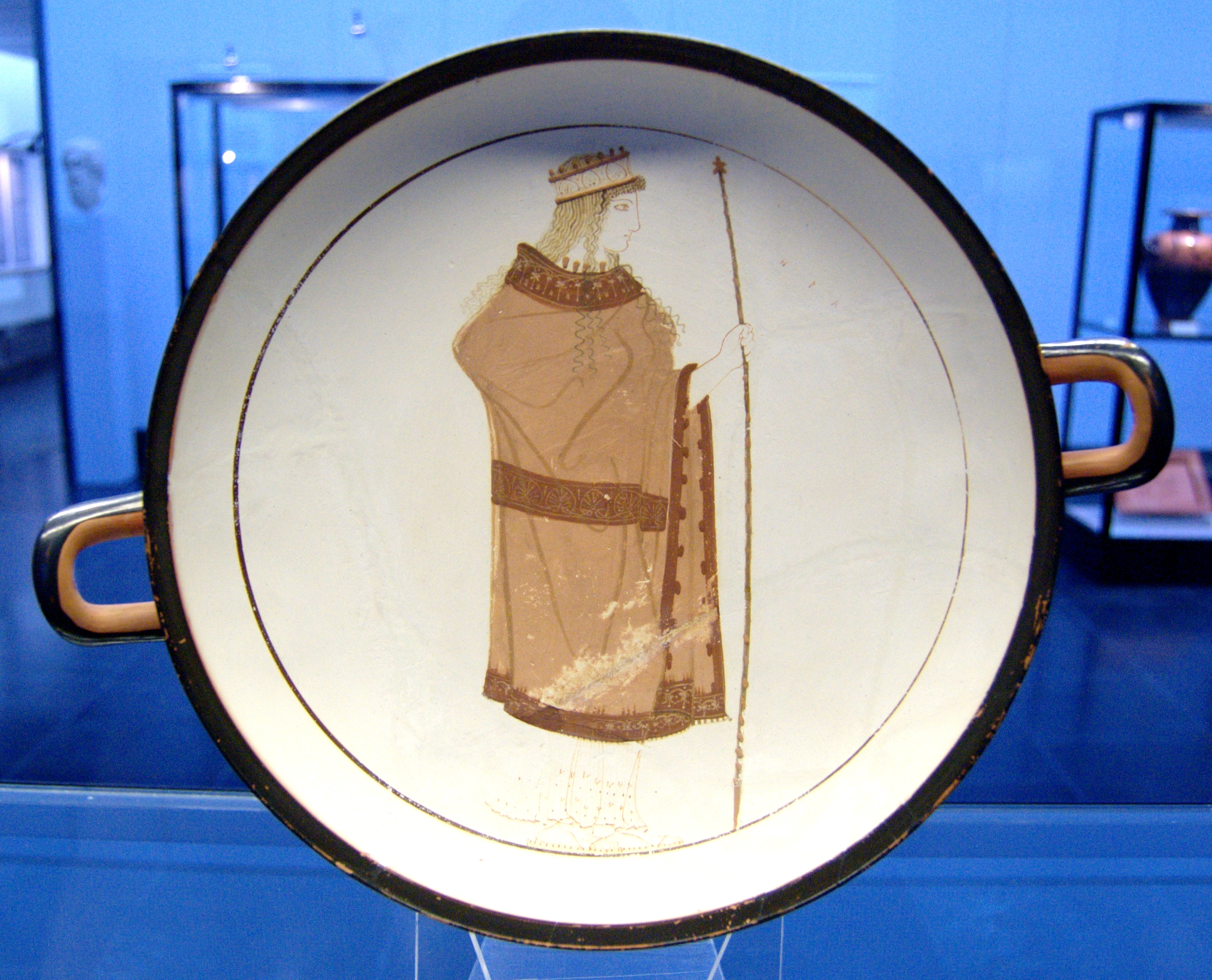
Hera on the tondo of an Attic white-ground kylix (type IV) found at Vulci, by the Sabouroff Painter (c. 470 BC)

The development of white-ground vase painting took place parallel to that of the black- and red-figure styles. In the course of that development, five sub-styles can be noted:

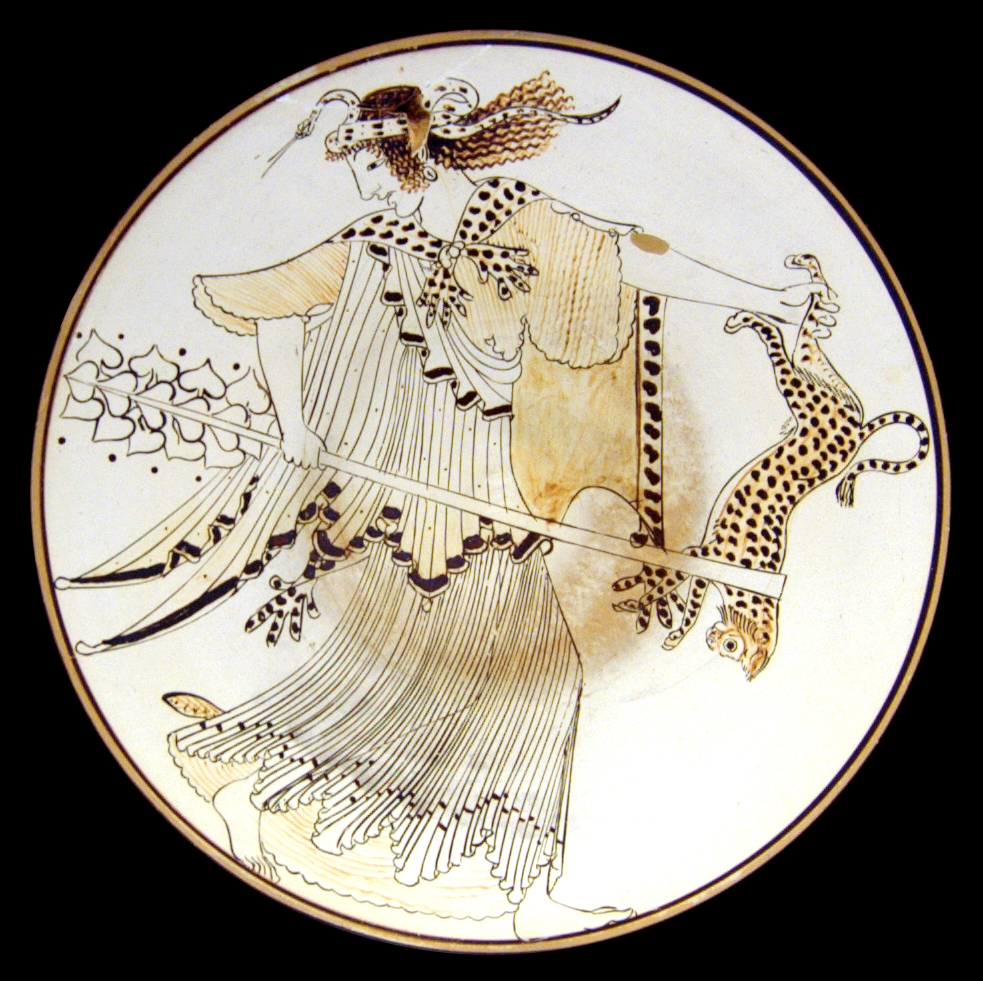
Raging maenad by the Brygos Painter. She holds a thyrsos in her right hand, her left is swinging a panther through the air. A snake is winding through the diadem in her hair. Tondo of a kylix, 490–480 BC. Staatliche Antikensammlungen, Munich.

Early use. The earliest surviving example of the technique is a fragmentary kantharos signed by the potter-painter Nearchos c. 570 BC . It was found on the Athenian Acropolis (Akropolis 611). The technique was used to create strobing bands of colour that emphasize the shape of the vase. and is associated with the workshops of Andokides, Nikosthenes and Psiax.

Type I. The use of a white ground in conjunction with outline painting did not develop until some fifty years later, when black-figure vase painting on white ground was probably introduced by the potter Nikosthenes around 530/525 BC. After a short interval, this technique was also adopted by other workshops, including that of Psiax. The manner of painting is the same as in conventional black-figure, the colour of the grounding being the only difference. The ground is rarely pure white, but usually slightly yellowish or light beige.

Type II. A second form is monochrome silhouette drawing. Images are not created from reservation (paint-free areas) and painted internal detail (as in red-figure vase painting), but from drawn outlines and painted internal detail. This style is used since the end of the 6th century BC, especially on cups, alabastra and lekythoi. Initially, the outline of the figures is executed in the form of a relief line, but from about 500 BC, this is increasingly replaced by painted yellowish-brown lines. The so-called "semi-outline" technique is a combination of the first and the second technique, used only in the first half of the 5th century BC, virtually exclusively on lekythoi and alabastra.

Type III. In the first quarter of the 5th century, the workshop of the potter Euphronios develops a four-colour painting style using a combination of shiny clay slip and mineral paints. The images are made up of outline drawings in shiny slip and coloured areas in mineral paint. This style is used especially on pyxides and cups. Some details, such as fruit, jewellery, weaponry or vessels can be executed in clay slip in such a fashion as to attain a slight plasticity, additionally they may be gilded. The paints used are limited to tones of red and brown, yellow, white and black.

Type IV. Early Classical lekythos painting combined shiny slip, mineral paints and non.ceramic mineral paints, This type developed in the second quarter of the 5th century BC. It was used in painting large grave lekythoi used in funerary cult. The images are mostly constructed of coloured areas. Pure outline drawing is only used for the depiction of male bodies at this stage. Female bodies are rendered in white paint, clothing in black shiny slip, mineral paints and occasionally non-ceramic paints such as cinnabarite or Egyptian blue. Many images depict scenes from women's life (the gynaikion). Grave images are rare. The most important representative of this style is the Achilles Painter.

Type V. The fifth style was polychrome lekythos painting. It replaced Early Classical lekythos painting around the middle of the 5th century BC. By this time, white-ground can be identified most closely with three principal shapes: the lekythos, the krater, and cups. Black shiny slip and white paint now disappeared from the paintings. Female bodies were again rendered as simple outline drawings. Non-ceramic mineral paints also ceased to be used. At the same time, several painters, starting with the Sabouroff Painter, began to use red or blackish-grey matt paints, instead of shiny slip, for the contours. Only the contours are painted before firing, other paints are applied afterwards. Therefore, the durability of such vase paintings is very limited; many examples are badly preserved or completely worn. As a result, it is difficult to assess the depicted motifs. Grave scenes are predominant.

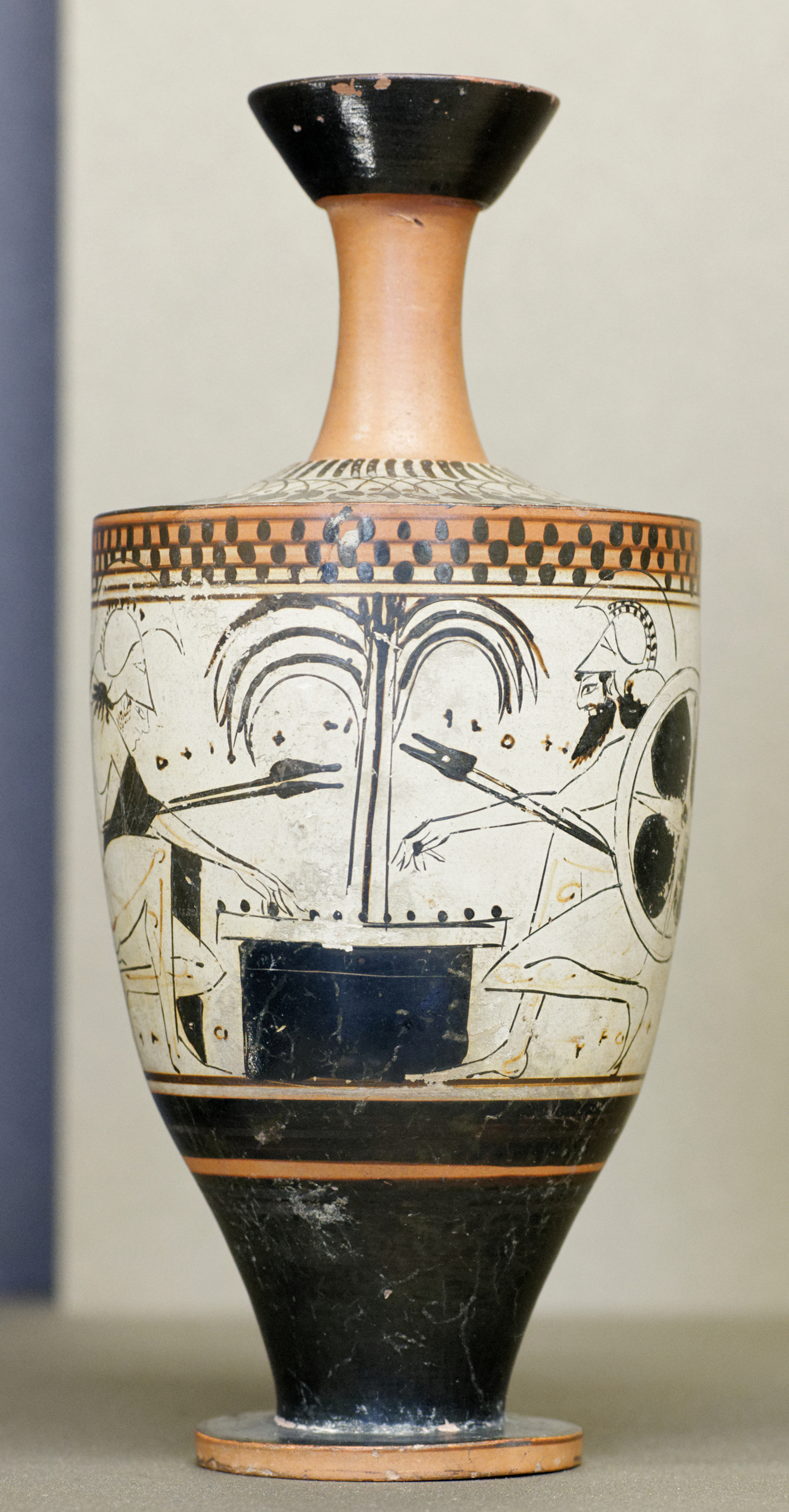
Achilles and Ajax playing a board game (Attic lekythos by the workshop of the Diosphos Painter, c. 500 BC)

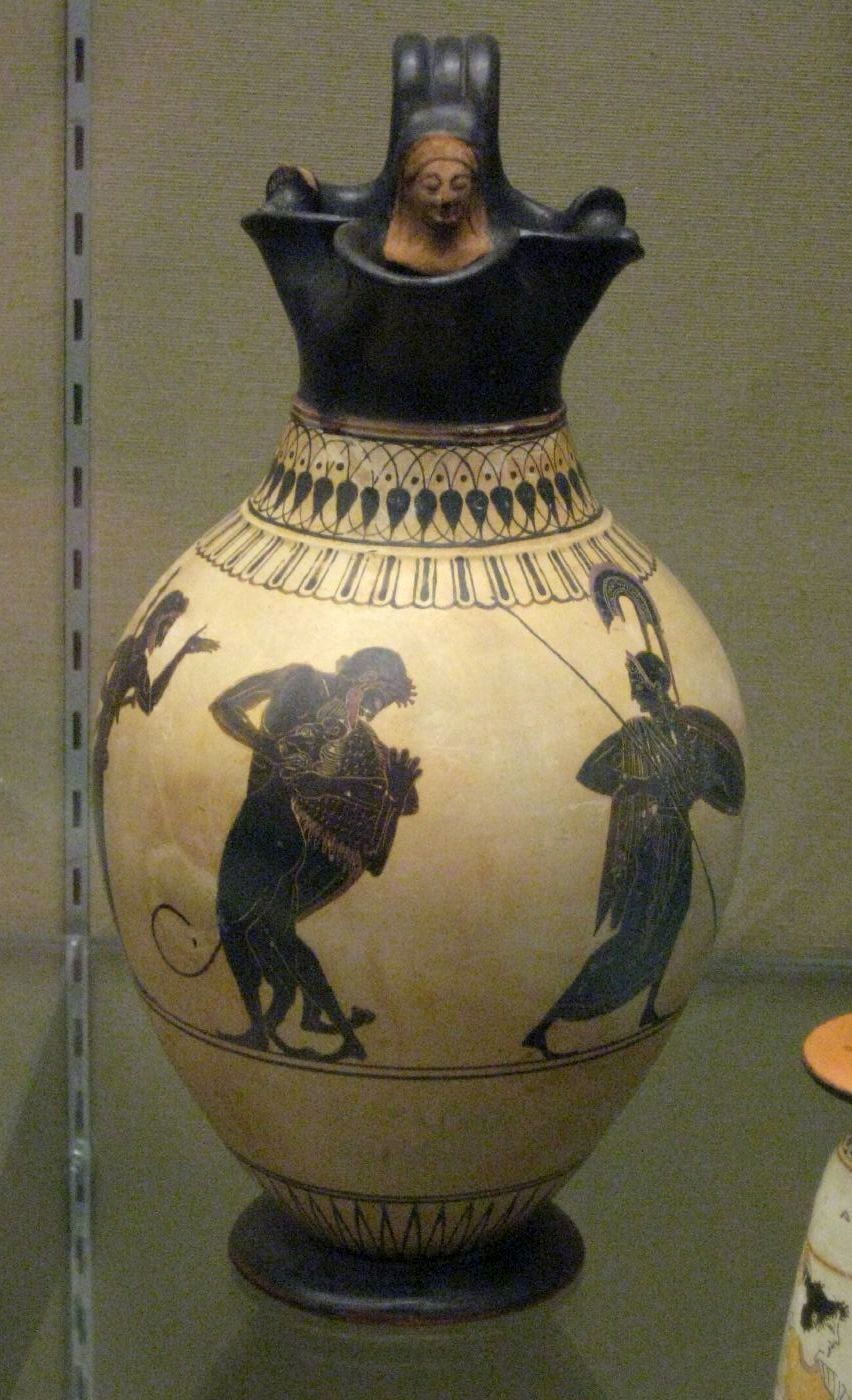
White-ground black-figure oinochoe (Wine-Jug) of Heracles and the Nemean lion, Athens, about 520–500 BC, attributed to the Painter of London, potted by Andokides.

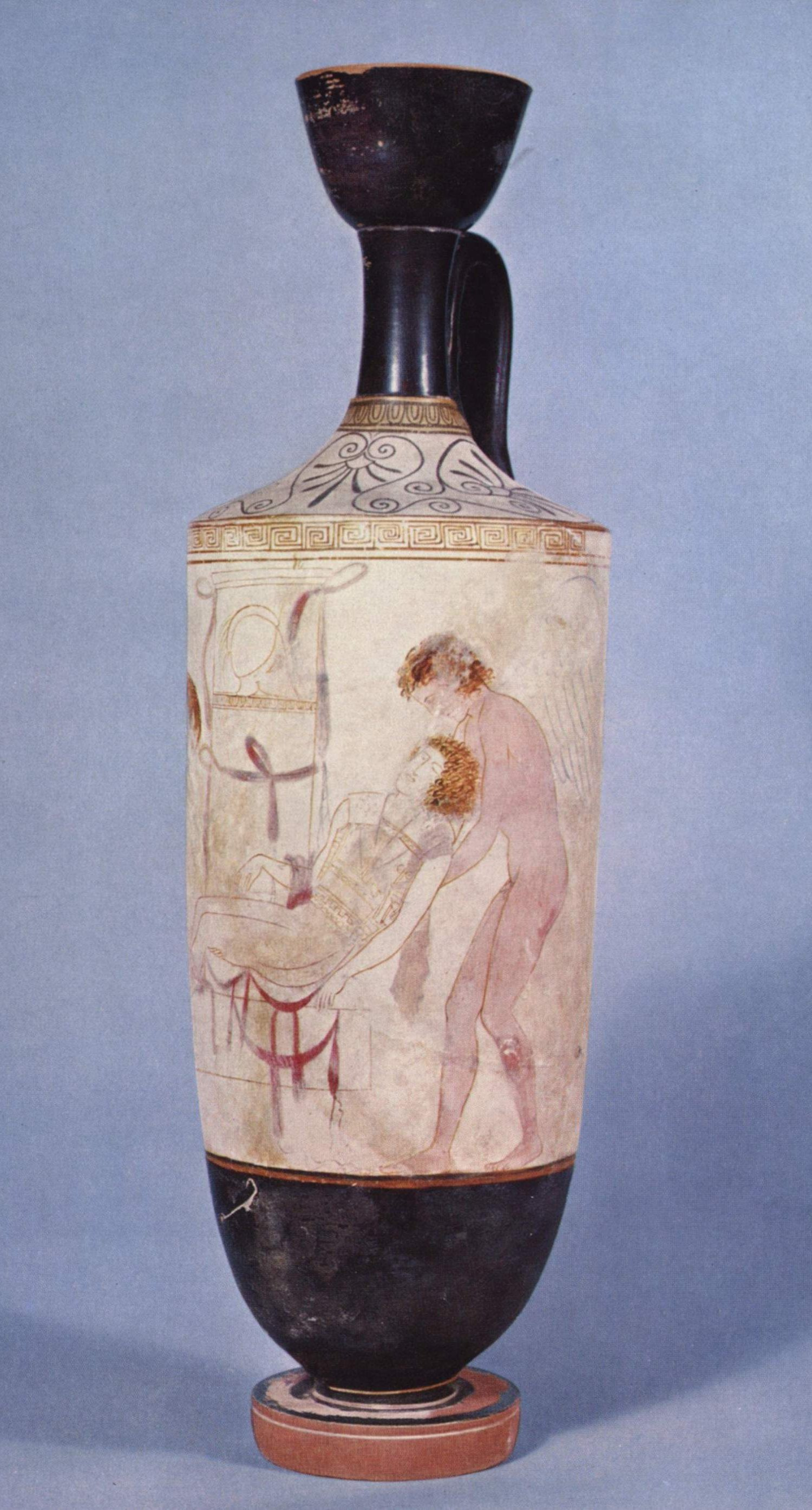
Hypnos and Thanatos removing the body of Sarpedon from the battlefield of Troy (lekythos, Thanatos Painter, c. 440 BC)

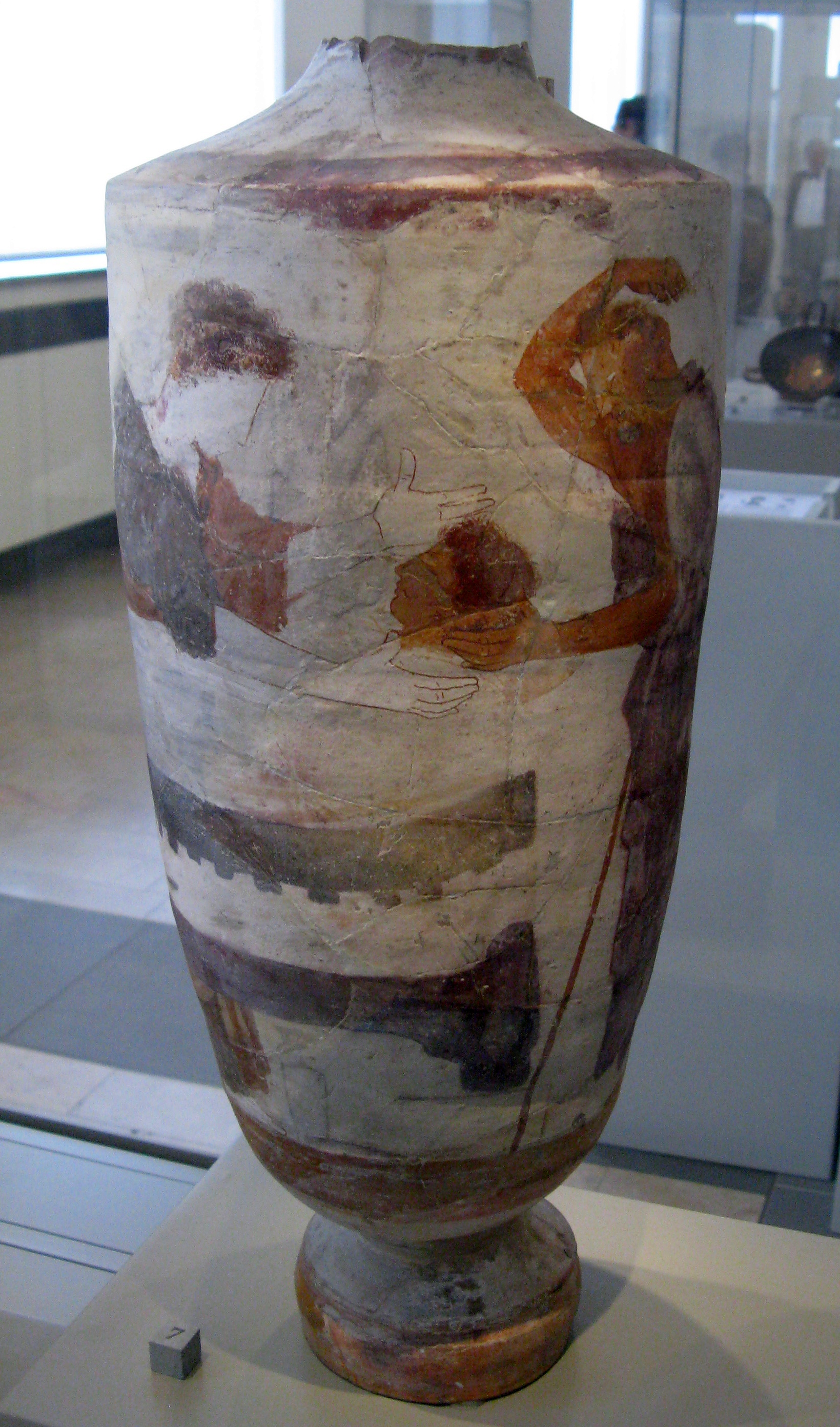
Prothesis (lying in repose) (Attic plychrome lekythos (type V), from Alopeke, Group of the Huge Lekythoi, late 5th century BC)

== Painters and distribution ==
Important Classical white-ground painters (5th century BC), in addition to the Achilleus Painter and Sabouroff Painter, include the Sappho Painter, Thanatos Painter, Bird Painter, Square Painter, Women Painter, Phiale Painter, as well as several representatives of Group R (Reed Group), including its eponymous Reed Painter. By the end of the century, some first attempts at shaded painting can be observed, influenced probably by contemporaneous panel painting. Notable in this regard is the Group of the Huge Lekythoi, specialised in decorating large grave vessels. During the second half of the 5th century, white-ground vase painting was used nearly exclusively for grave lekythoi. When that vase type went out of use around 400 BC, white-ground vase painting also ceased.

Later, during the Hellenistic period, various types of white-ground pottery occur in several locations of the Greek World, sometimes painted monochrome, sometimes polychrome. They include Hâdra vases, Canosa vases and vases of the Centuripe type. Lagynoi were often decorated in white-ground technique.

== Bibliography ==
- Donna Kurtz: Athenian White Lekythoi. Patterns and Painters, Clarendon Press, Oxford 1975.
- Lévêque, Pierre; The Birth of Greece, "Abrams Discoveries" series, New York, 1994. ISBN 978-0-810-92843-5.
- John Oakley: Picturing Death in Classical Athens. The Evidence of the White Lekythoi, Cambridge University Press, Cambridge 2004. ISBN 0-521-82016-2.
- E. Pottier, Étude sur les lécythes blancs antiques, 1883.
- Schoder, Raymond V.; Masterpieces of Greek Art. New York Graphic Society.
- Irma Wehgartner: Attisch weissgrundige Keramik. Maltechniken, Werkstätten, Formen, Verwendung, von Zabern, Mainz 1983 (Keramikforschungen, Vol 5). ISBN 3-8053-0565-6.
- Irma Wehgartner: Weißgrundige Vasenmalerei. In: Der Neue Pauly, vol. 12, cols. 454–456.
- Woodford, Susan; An Introduction to Greek Art, New York, 1988.
- Von Bothmer, Dietrich (1987). Greek vase painting. New York: The Metropolitan Museum of Art. ISBN 0870990845.
