= Thanatos Painter =

Athenian painter of the 5th century BC

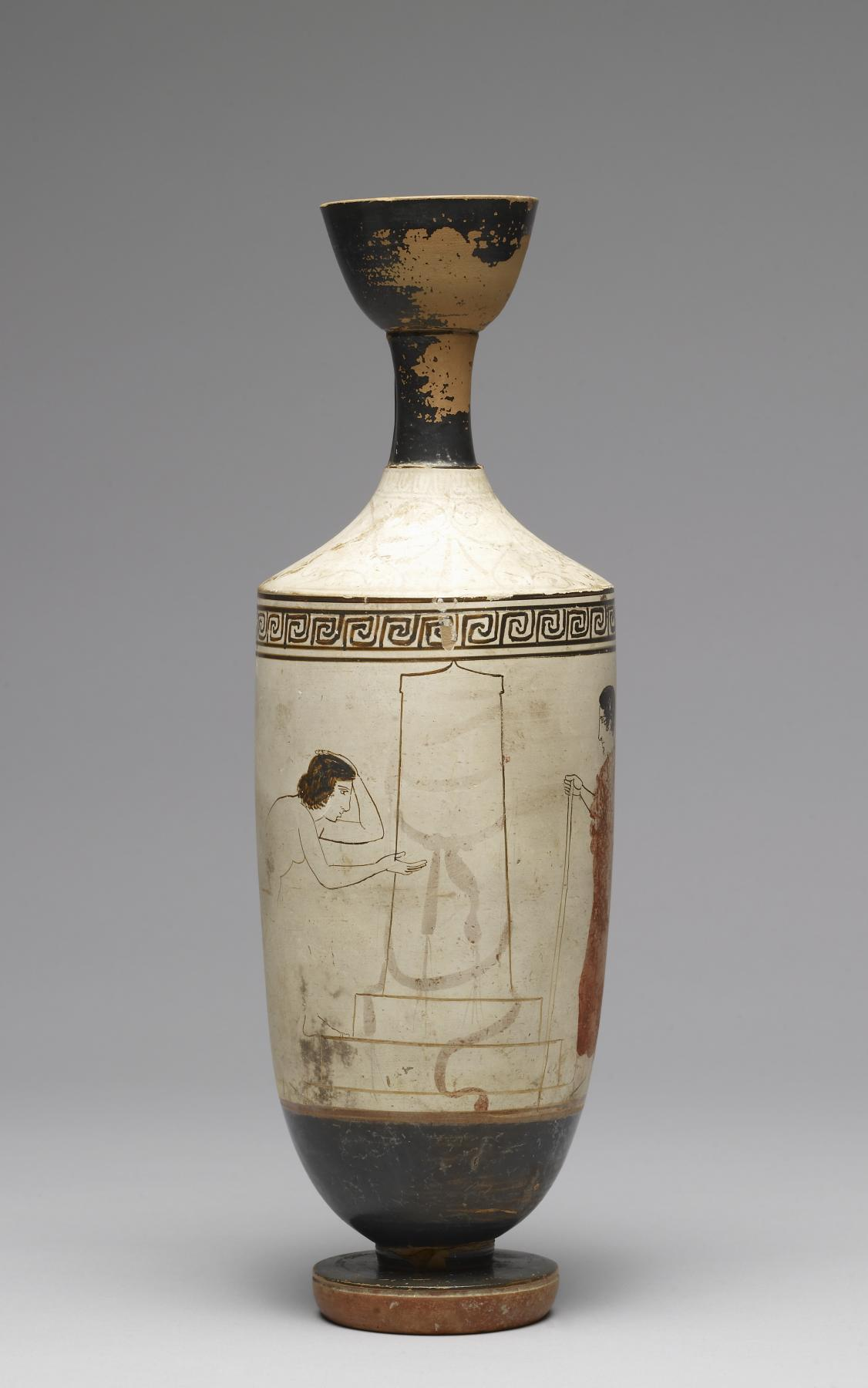
Woman mourning at grave.

The Thanatos Painter (5th century BCE) was an Athenian Ancient Greek vase painter who painted scenes of death on white-ground cylindrical lekythoi. All of the Thanatos Painter's found lekythoi have scenes of or related to death (thanatos in Greek) on them, including the eponymous god of death Thanatos carrying away dead bodies.

== Lekythoi ==
=== Women mourning Lekythos ===
One example of a white-ground lekythos by the Thanatos Painter is a vase in the Art Walters Museum (440–430 BCE). The women are mourning over a deceased family member. There is a male figure approaching from the right side of the lekythos that is unseen by the women. He is a representation of the deceased family member. The Greeks believed that the deceased lingered over their grave after death.

The deceased man is the main focus of the painting due to the red color of his clothes. Since this is a lekythos from his grave he is the main focus as a reminder to mourn his death. The women is also bent over which leads the eye to the grave stele and finally to the man, making him even more of the main focus. The grave has ribbon or rope that swoops back and forth which pulls the eye back and forth between the two figures.

=== Hypnos and Thanatos Lekythos ===
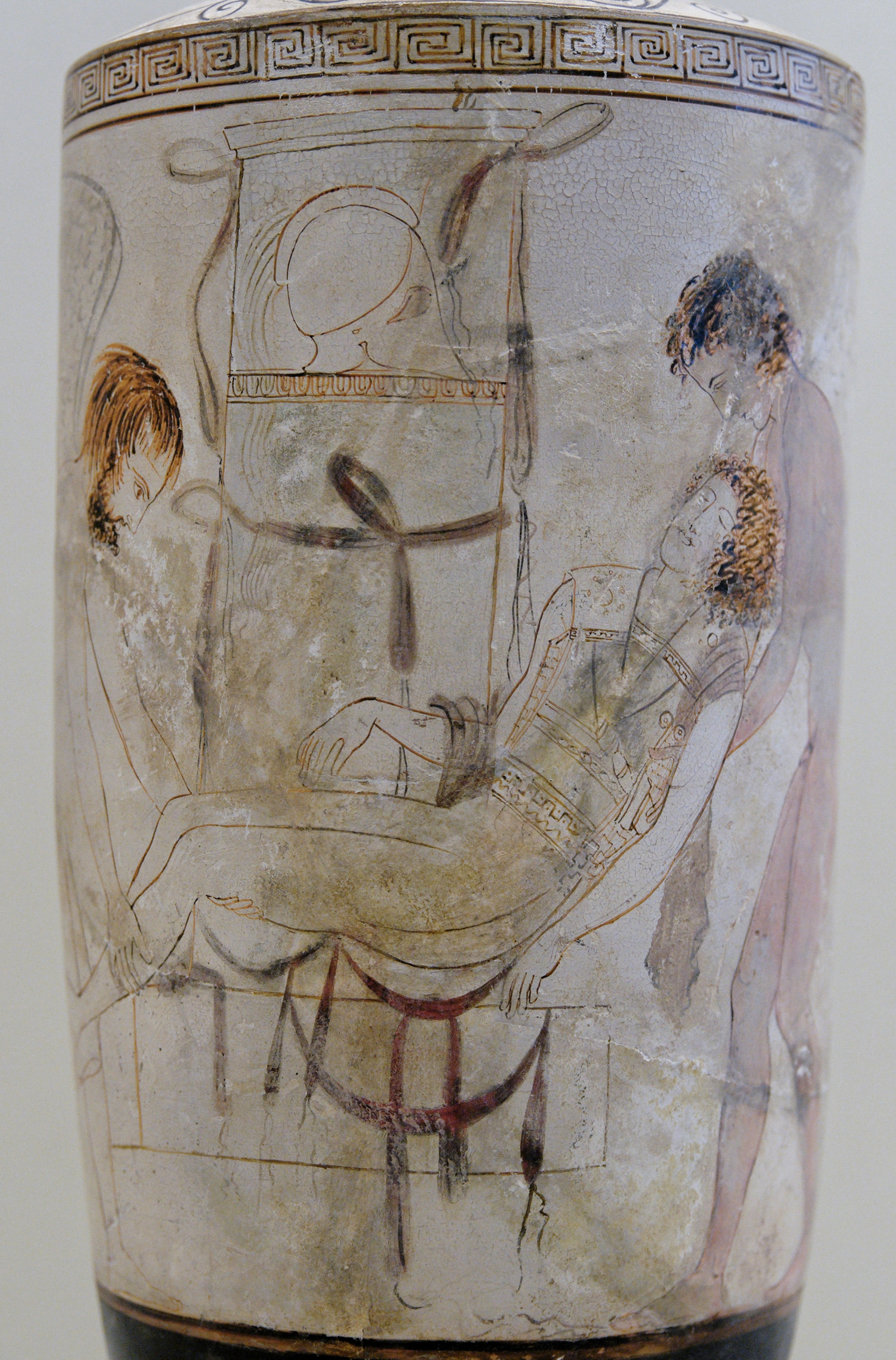
Hypnos and Thanatos carrying body of Sarpedon from the battlefield of Troy.

Another example of a white-ground lekythos by the Thanatos Painter is of Hynos and Thanatos carrying Sarpedon (435–425 BCE); it is located in the British Museum. On the lekythos Hypnos, the Greek personification of sleep, and Thanatos, the Greek god of death, are carrying Sarpedon who was Zeus' son. Sarpedon was one of Zeus' favorite sons and he entrusted Hynos and Thanatos to deliver Sarpedon's body to where he would be buried in Lycia.

Sleep is near Sarpedon's head and Death is near his feet. Sleep is almost cradling Sarpedon’s head and it is laid on top Sleep’s heart. This could be symbolic of the fact that Zeus holds Sarpedon near. The grave stele is in an area to help there from being a giant blank area. If it was not where it is, there would be a huge gap between the head of Death and the other two figures heads. The stele allows for continuity throughout the painting.

The eyes in this painting are all looking at different subjects. Sleep and Death are looking at Sarpedon, almost like they are being careful with that they are doing. The helmet on the grave stele is looking at Sleep, or just over his head. This could be the helmet looking into the future or raising its ‘eyes’ to the heavens. Sarpedon’s eyes are half open and looking out at the viewer. This image is present on many other forms of pottery, and especially connected to the funerary context.

== Lekythoi in funerary context ==
White-ground lekythoi are used specifically in the funeral context and were sometimes used to replace grave stele. Lekythoi were used to hold funerary oil, typically olive oil. Most were hollow except for the very top 'cup' which would hold the oil, so the lekythoi would always look full. This oil was used to wash the deceases body, and then the body would be wrapped in clean cloth. This would help prepare the body for the afterlife. Lekythoi had different scenes on them that depicted death, such as: inhumation, procession, and visitations to graves.

They had vibrantly painted, detailed scenes of death as the main focal point of the pottery. Marble lekythoi could be used as grave markers and had relief sculpture that was painted, instead of just painting like terracotta lekythoi had. Some marble lekythoi were used as a grave marker for a family plot, instead of for a single person. They were also a symbol of status as any elaborate grave marker would have been at this time.

== See also ==
- Death in ancient Greek art
