= Hadra vase =

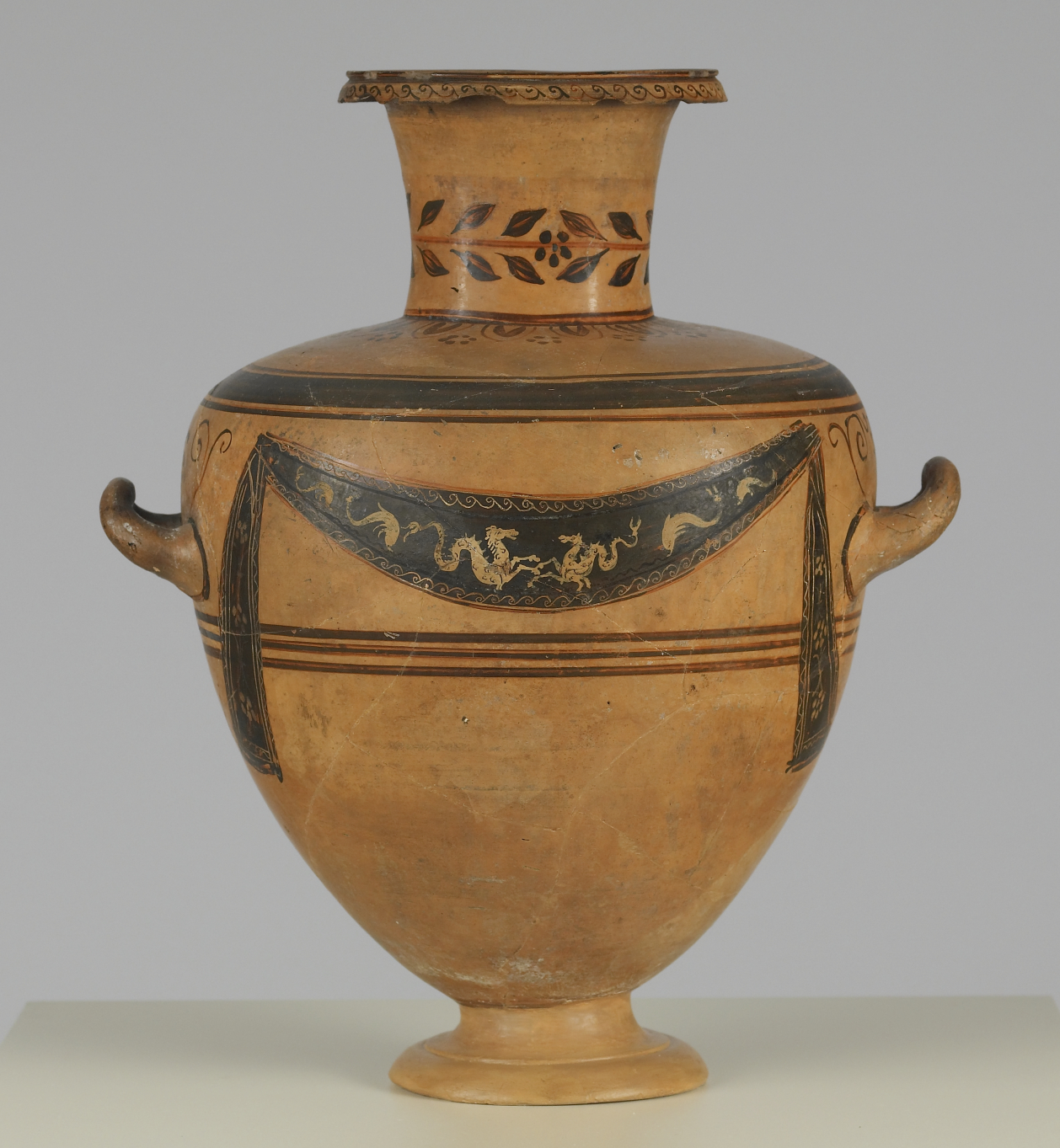
From Egypt, c. 230 BC

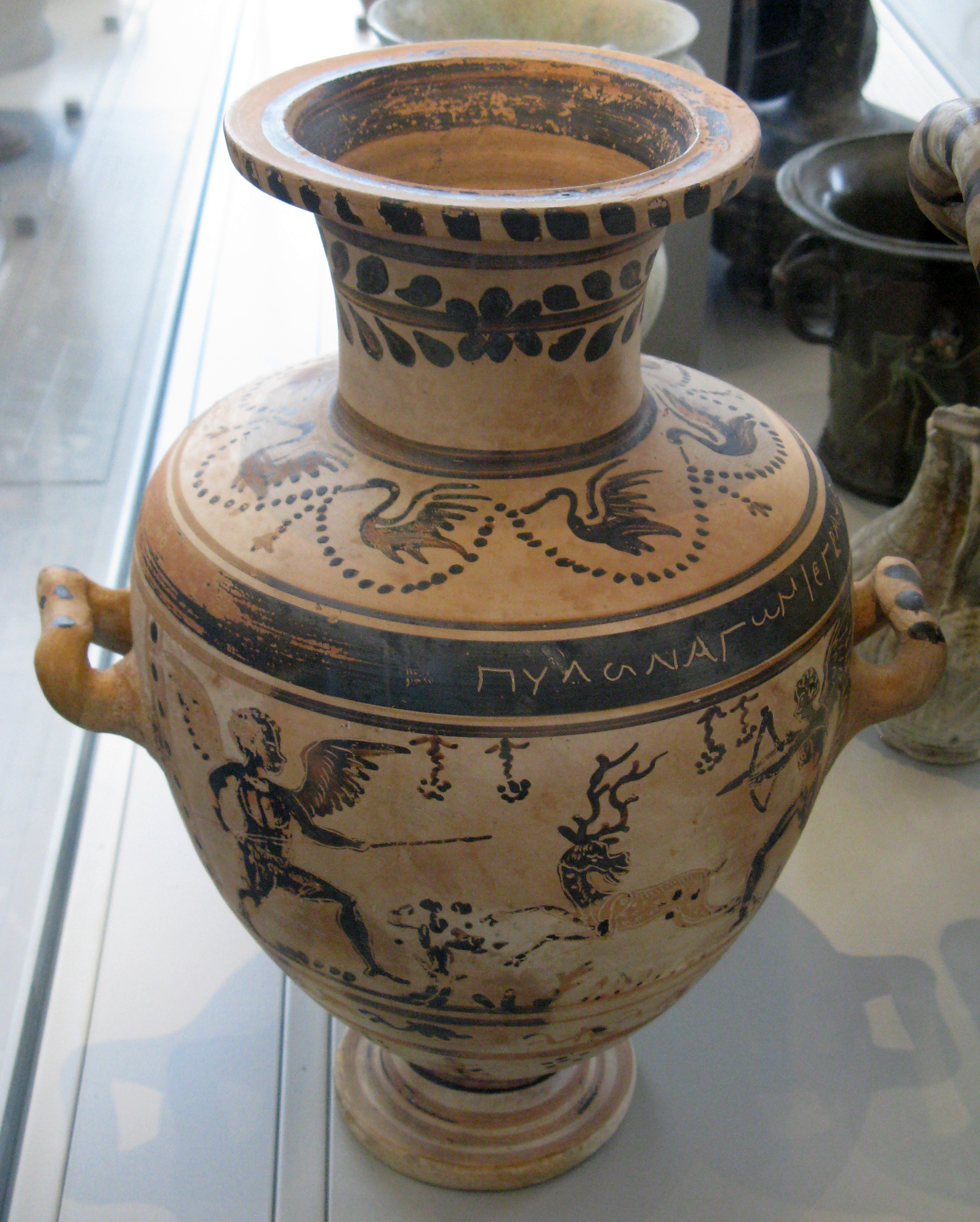
Egyptian Hâdra vase, 3rd century

The modern scholarly term Hâdra vases (also Hadra vases) describes a group of Hellenistic painted hydriai. Apart from late Panathenaic prize amphorae, it is the only substantial group of figurally or ornamentally painted vases in the Greek world of the 3rd century BC (the rare Centuripe ware vases from Sicily continued even later).

The modern name of the type is derived from its main findspot, a cemetery at Hâdra near Alexandria in Egypt. About 300 pieces are known. They had developed from white-ground hydriai, which were earlier also considered part of the type. Painting was applied with dark glaze, in the early period some vases were painted in polychrome. Originally, scholars considered the vases a local Graeco-Egyptian project, but recent scientific studies have shown that they originate from Central Crete, where the majority were produced. Today, four main groups of Hâdra vases can be distinguished: the Laurel Group, with 14 known painters the most extensively researched one, the Dolphin Group with eight painters, the Simple Group and the Group with Twigless Laurel Leaves, from which two painters are known so far. The Simple Group is considered the oldest, it so named because of the striking simplicity of its works. The Group of the Twigless Laurel Leaves is the only one based at Alexandria, chronologically it is late.

Hâdra vases have not only been found in Egypt. Considerable numbers are also known from Crete, where they were used mainly in domestic contexts. In Alexandria, whence the majority of them was exported, they were used mostly as funerary urns. On 30 of them, detailed written information about those whose remains they contained was found, such as name, rank, origin, the name of the official organising the funeral, even the date of death or burial. Those buried in them comprised ambassadors and mercenary leaders who died in Alexandria and received a state funeral. The inscriptions permit the exact dating of some of the vases, although the omission of the currently ruling member of the Ptolemaic dynasty has led to the occasional controversy. Scholars assume that the first inscribed vases date to about 260 BC, and the last decorated specimens to the very beginning of the 2nd century BC. Undecorated Hâdra vases were produced until the 1st century BC. Apart from Egypt and Crete, Hâdra vases have also been found in Eretria, Attica, Rhodes, Cilicia, Cyrene, Cyprus and the Black Sea area.

Hydrai of the Hellenistic period were smaller than those in use earlier, especially in the 6th and 5th centuries BC. The decoration on Hâdra vases can resemble that of Geometric pottery. The colouring, using dark slip s, also resembles Geometric and Archaic precedents. Even the composition of the decoration is reminiscent of subgeometric pottery by East Greek workshops. It can be assumed, that the vessel type was introduced to Egypt to permit Greek-style funerals. It is also possible that the potters and painters were inspired by Graeco-Egyptian material that had retained ancient styles of decoration. Thus, it is possible that this vase type could survive here, although it had gone out of use in the Greek motherland. The fact that most of those buried in them bear Greek names seems to support this.

== Bibliography ==
- Roald Fritjof Docter: Hâdra-Vasen, in Der Neue Pauly, vol. 5 (1998), col. 53-54.
- Norbert Kunisch: Erläuterungen zur Griechischen Vasenmalerei. 50 Hauptwerke der Sammlung antiker Vasen in der Ruhr-Universität Bochum, Böhlau, Köln 1996, p. 233-36 ISBN 3-412-03996-9
- Brian F. Cook: Inscribed Hadra Vases in The Metropolitan Museum of Art, in The Metropolitan Museum of Art Papers, no. 12, 1966.
