= Lekythion =

Metrical pattern in poetry

A lekythion or lecythion, in classical Greek and Latin poetry, is a metric pattern (colon) defined by a sequence of seven alternating long and short syllables at the end of a verse (— u — x — u —). (Note: Here and below, "—" stands for a metrically long syllable, "u" for a short one, and "x" for one that may be optionally long or short.) In classical grammatical terminology it can be described as a trochaic dimeter catalectic, i.e. a combination of two groups of two trochees each (— u — x), with the second of these groups lacking its final syllable; or as a trochaic hepthemimer, i.e. a trochaic sequence of seven half-feet. A lekythion can appear in several different metric contexts in different types of poetry, either alone as a verse or as the second of two cola following a caesura. A frequent type of occurrence in Greek drama is in lines of iambic trimeter, the most frequent metre used in spoken dialogue, i.e. lines of the type x — u — | x — u — | x — u —. These lines may have a metric caesura after the first five syllables, with the remaining line thus resulting in a lekythion group.

The lekythion also has a catalectic form known as the ithyphallic, of which the pattern is – u – u – x.

== In Euripides and Aristophanes ==
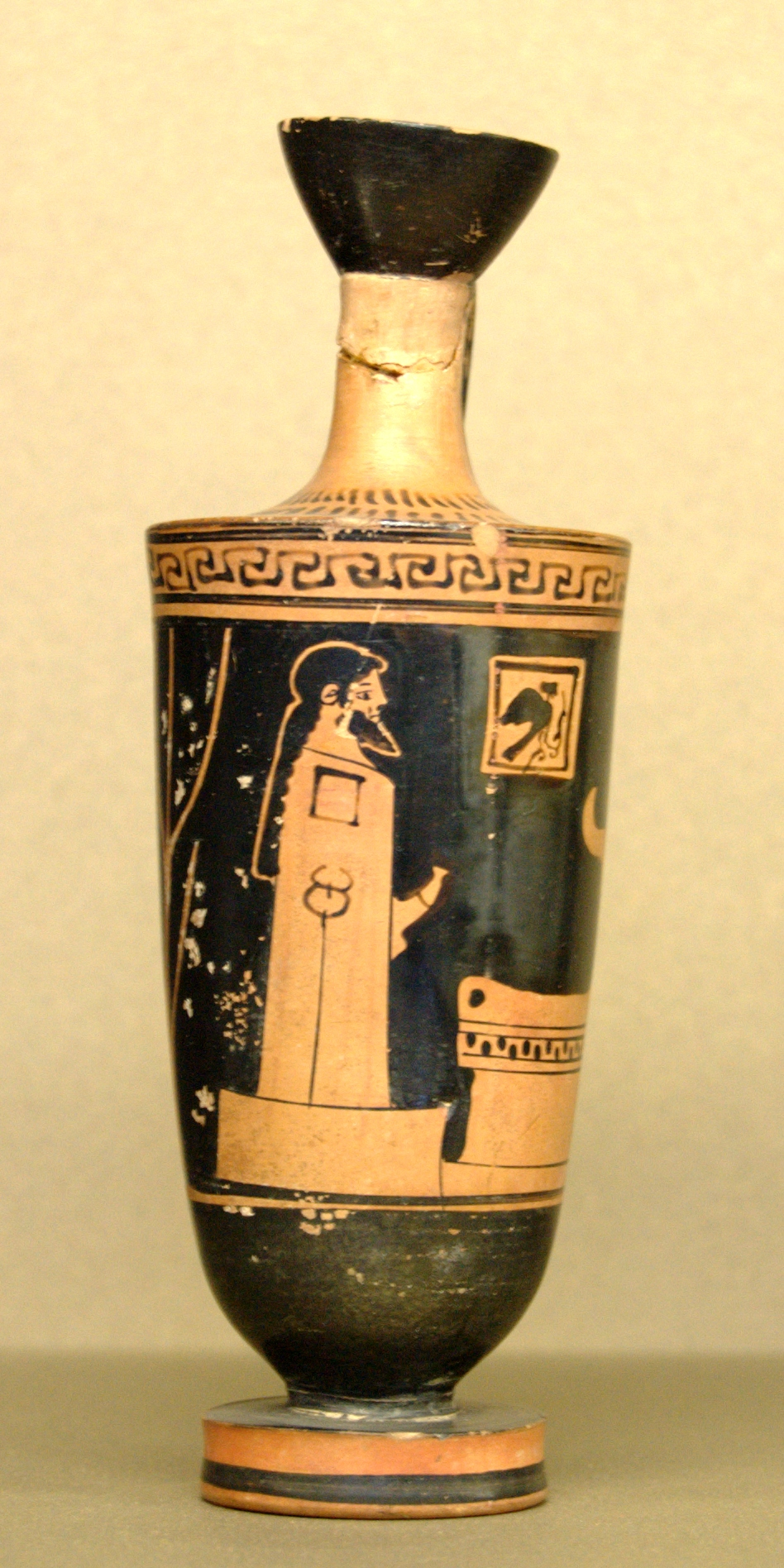
A small oil-flask or lekythos, one of the various shapes of oil-flask used in classical Athens

The term lēkythion literally means "small oil-flask" (from ληκύθιον, the diminutive form of λήκυθος, lēkythos). The term was coined in reference to a passage in the comedy The Frogs by Aristophanes, in which the two poets Aeschylus and Euripides are engaged in a comic debate criticizing each other's works. Aeschylus makes Euripides recite the beginnings of seven of his tragic prologues (all in iambic trimeter), each time interrupting him and interjecting the same phrase "... lost his little oil flask" (ληκύθιον ἀπώλεσεν), wherever the verse offers an opportunity, which is frequently the case because of Euripides' propensity to use a metric caesura after the first five syllables.

Below, as an example, is one of the original passages of Euripides (from the prologue of Iphigenia in Tauris): (Note: The remainder of the Euripidean passages cited in the Frogs are from plays that are otherwise lost, so the original continuation of the lines is unknown.)

Πέλοψ ὁ Ταντάλειος ἐς Πῖσαν μολὼν
θοαῖσιν ἵπποις Οἰνομάου (Note: For correct scansion, the letters "-άου" in "Οἰνομάου" have to be read as a single syllable, by synizesis.) γαμεῖ κόρην.

Pélops ho Tantáleios es Pîsan molṑn
thoaîsin híppois Oinomáou gameî kórēn.

u — u — | u — u — | — — u —
u — u — | — — u — | u — u —

("Pelops, son of Tantalus, coming to Pisa
with swift horses, married Oenomaus' daughter.")

Aristophanes' parody, as it occurs in the Frogs, is as follows:

"Πέλοψ ὁ Ταντάλειος ἐς Πῖσαν μολὼν
"θοαῖσιν ἵπποις" – "ληκύθιον ἀπώλεσεν"

"Pélops ho Tantáleios es Pîsan molṑn
thoaîsin híppois" – "lēkúthion apṓlesen"

u — u — | u — u — | — — u —
u — u — | — — u uu | u — u —

("Pelops, son of Tantalus, coming to Pisa
with swift horses" – "lost his little oil flask.")

The shape of flask indicated by the word lekythion has been debated by scholars, but it is believed by many that the lekythion was probably the small round flask known to modern scholars (although not to ancient writers) as the aryballos.

The point of the seven times repeated joke has also been much debated, but the majority of scholars believe that as well as poking fun at the style of Euripides' prologues, there is probably a sexual innuendo, giving the meaning "became impotent", "lost his testicles" etc.

== In Aeschylus ==
Lekythia are a prominent feature of the choral odes of Aeschylus's Oresteia trilogy, for example in the following lines of Agamemnon. The section below contains six lekythia:

Ζεύς, ὅστις ποτ᾽ ἐστίν, εἰ τόδ᾽ αὐ-
τῷ φίλον κεκλημένῳ,
τοῦτό νιν προσεννέπω.
οὐκ ἔχω προσεικάσαι
πάντ᾽ ἐπισταθμώμενος
πλὴν Διός, εἰ τὸ μάταν ἀπὸ φροντίδος ἄχθος
χρὴ βαλεῖν ἐτητύμως.

Zeús, hóstis pot᾽ estín, ei tód᾽ au-
tôi phílon keklēménōi,
toûtó nin prosennépō.
ouk ékhō proseikásai
pánt᾽ epistathmṓmenos
plḕn Diós, ei tò mátan apò phrontídos ákhthos
khrḕ baleîn etētúmōs.

– – | – u – u | – u – (spondee + lekythion)
— u — u | — u — (lekythion)
— u — u | — u — (lekythion)
— u — u | — u — (lekythion)
— u — u | — u — (lekythion)
— uu | — uu | — uu | — uu | – – (4 dactyls + spondee)
— u — u | — u — (lekythion)

('Zeus, whoever he may be, — if by this name
it pleases him to be invoked,
by this name I call to him. —
I have nothing to compare,
as I weigh all things in the balance,
save “Zeus,” if in truth I must cast aside
this vain burden from my heart.')

Charles Chiasson suggests that lekythia in the Oresteia "typically accompany manifestations or threats of a conspicuously harsh divine justice characterized by violence, human suffering, and death".

== In Hephaestion ==
As a technical term in metrical analysis, the term "lekythion" is first attested in the 2nd century AD, in the Handbook of Metrics by the grammarian Hephaestion. Hephaestion also calls the pattern the "Euripideum" ("τὸ καλούμενον Εὐριπίδειον ἢ Ληκύθιον", "the so-called Euripideum or Lekythion"). While Hephaestion does not explicitly refer to the passage in The Frogs, he cites some other verses from Euripides as an example. Here the lekythion is found alone as a full line, in a piece of choral lyrics from the tragedy Phoenissae:

νῦν δέ μοι πρὸ τειχέων
θούριος μολὼν Ἄρης

nûn dé moi prò teikhéōn
thoúrios molṑn Árēs

— u — u | — u —
— u — u | — u —

("Now furious Ares has come before my walls ...")
