= Lekythos =

Type of ancient Greek jug

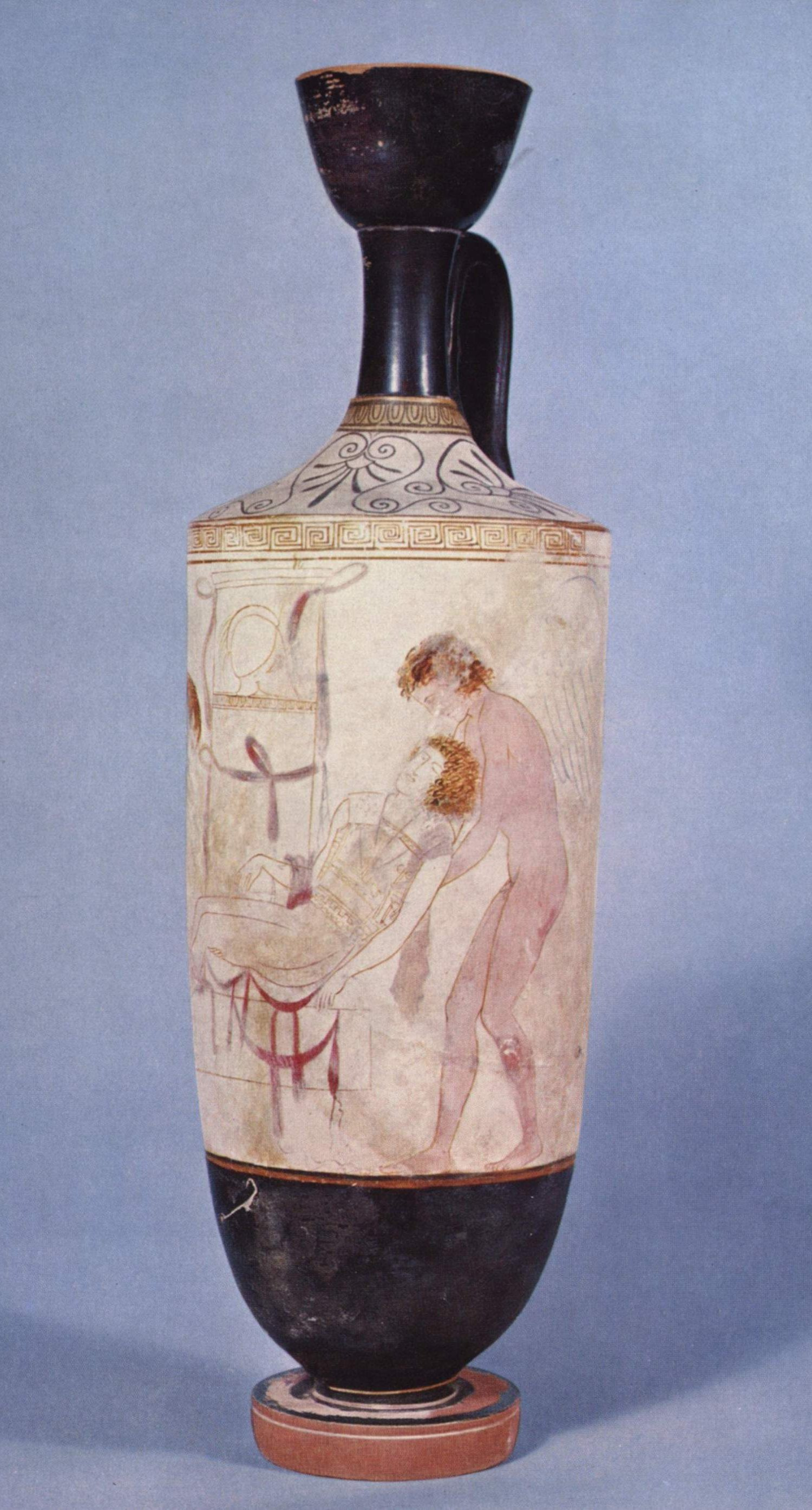
Hypnos and Thanatos carrying the body of Sarpedon from the battlefield of Troy; detail from an Attic white-ground lekythos, c. 440 BC

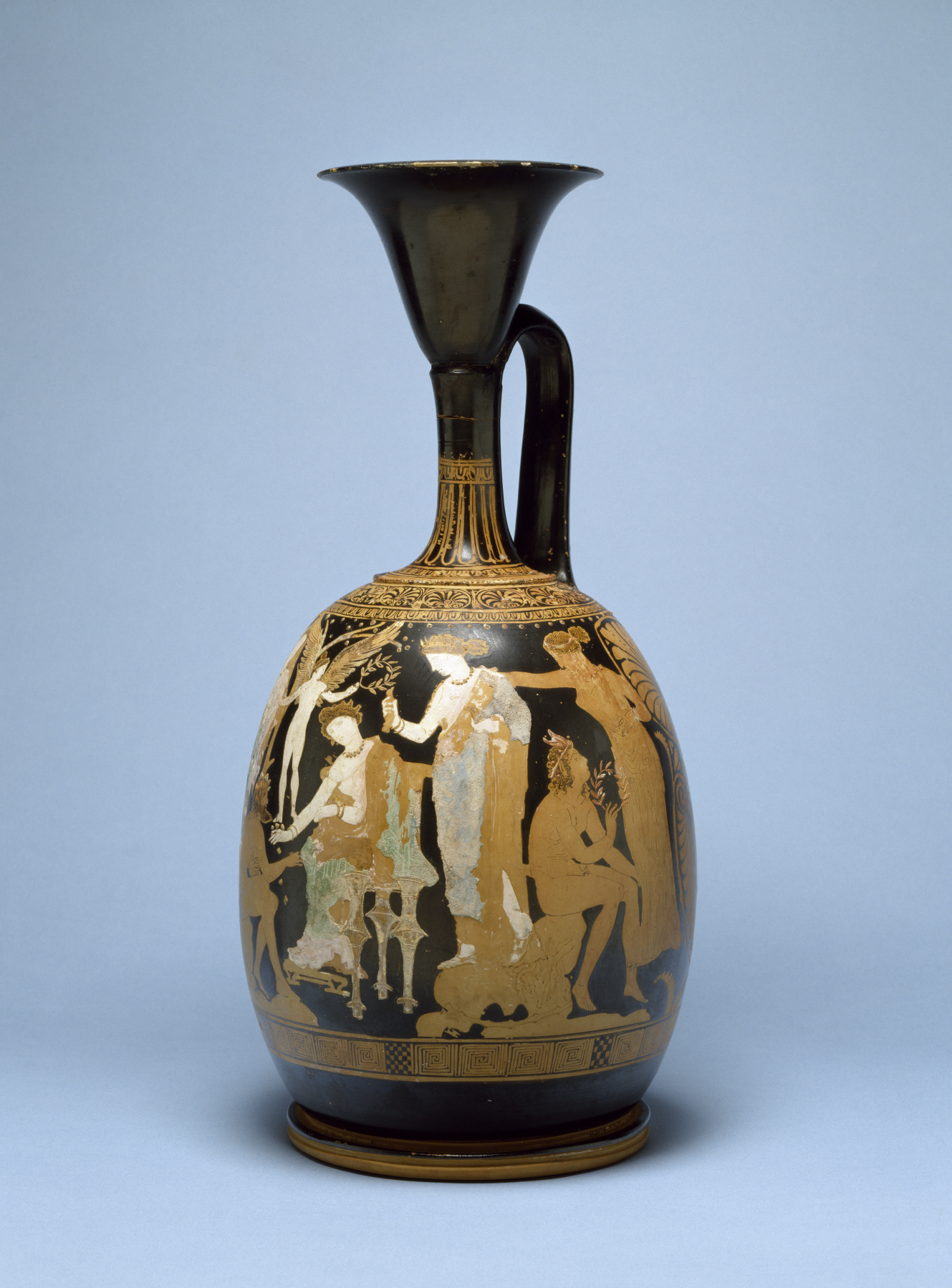
A red-figure pottery (terracotta) "kerch" style lekythos depicting a nymph and satyr playing a game of knucklebones, with two Eros figures (standing between Aphrodite) offering laurel wreaths of victory to the nymph and to a youth, c. 350 BC

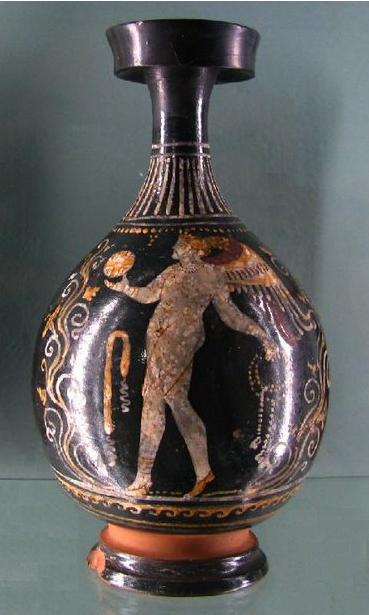
A lekythos in Gnathia style with Eros depicted playing with a ball, Apulian vase painting, third quarter of the 4th century BC

A lekythos (Ancient Greek: λήκυθος; pl.: lekythoi) is a type of ancient Greek vessel used for storing oil, especially olive oil. It has a narrow body and one handle attached to the neck of the vessel, and is thus a narrow type of jug, with no pouring lip; the oinochoe is more like a modern jug. In the "shoulder" and "cylindrical" types which became the most common, especially the latter, the sides of the body are usually vertical by the shoulder, and there is then a sharp change of direction as the neck curves in; the base and lip are normally prominent and flared. However, there are a number of varieties, and the word seems to have been used even more widely in ancient times than by modern archeologists. They are normally in pottery, but there are also carved stone examples.

Lekythoi were especially associated with funerary rites, and with the white ground technique of vase painting, which was too fragile for most items in regular use. Because of their handle they were normally only decorated with one image, on the other side from the handle; they are often photographed with the handle hidden, to show the painted image.

== Function ==
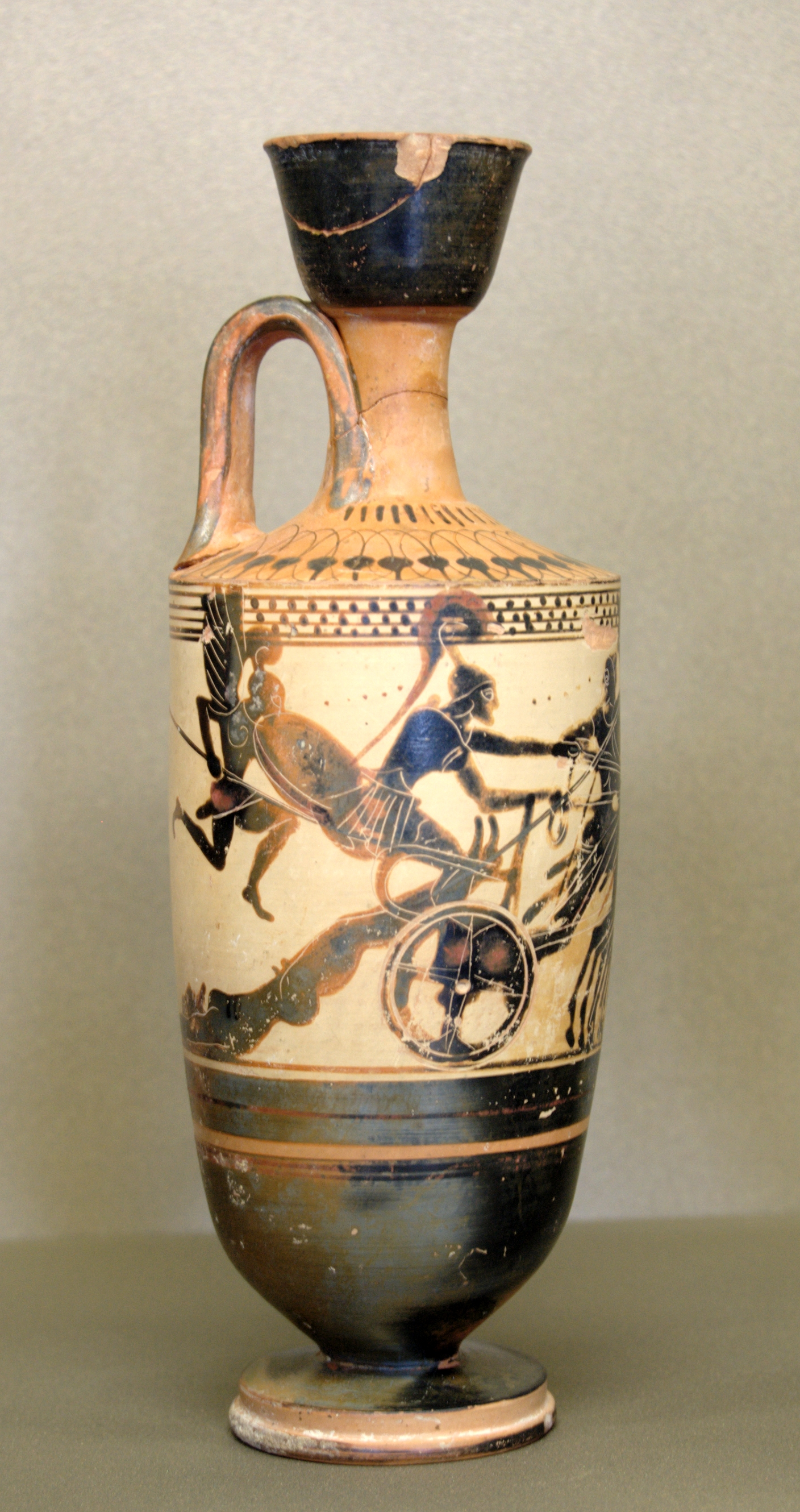
Attic white ground lekythos, c. 490 BC, Achilles dragging the body of Hector

The lekythos was used for anointing the bodies of the dead, and many lekythoi are found in tombs. The images on lekythoi were often depictions of daily activities or rituals. Because they are so often used in funerary situations, they may also depict funerary rites, a scene of loss, or a sense of departure as a form of funerary art. These are usually outline drawings that are quite expressionless and somber. The decoration of these ceramic vessels consists of dull red and black paint. These colors may have been derived from the Bronze Age, but were not used until 530 BC in Athens. Many artists of these vessels attempted to add more color to the figures, but later abandoned the idea, which provides more of a contrast. These vessels were very popular during the 5th century BC, however, many have been found dating back to 700 BC.

They contained a perfumed oil which was offered either to the dead person or to the gods of the underworld. Some lekythoi were fitted with a small, inner chamber, limiting the amount of oil required to fill them. The lekythos was used to smear perfumed oil on a woman's skin prior to getting married and were often placed in tombs of unmarried women to allow them to prepare for a wedding in the afterlife.

== Types ==
Lekythoi can be divided into five types:

- the standard or cylindrical lekythos, which measures between 30 and 50 cm (12 and 20 in), though there are much larger "huge lekythoi", up to 1 m (3 ft 3 in), which may have been used to replace funerary stele;
- the Deianeria lekythos which originates from Corinth; this form, with an oval profile and a round shoulder and generally small in size (20 cm), was produced from the beginning of the black-figure period until the end of the 6th century;
- the shoulder or secondary lekythos, a variation on the standard type produced from the mid 5th century on. These have a fuller, swelling body; most are decorated with the white ground technique and measure around 20 cm (8 in);
- the squat lekythos, usually less than 20 cm in height, with a rounded belly and a flat base;
- the acorn lekythos, a rarer form, which has an oval profile and at the bottom of the body a raised cup with protrusions, like the cup of an acorn.

There are also "plastic" lekythoi, with bodies formed in the shape of a head, animal, or other form.

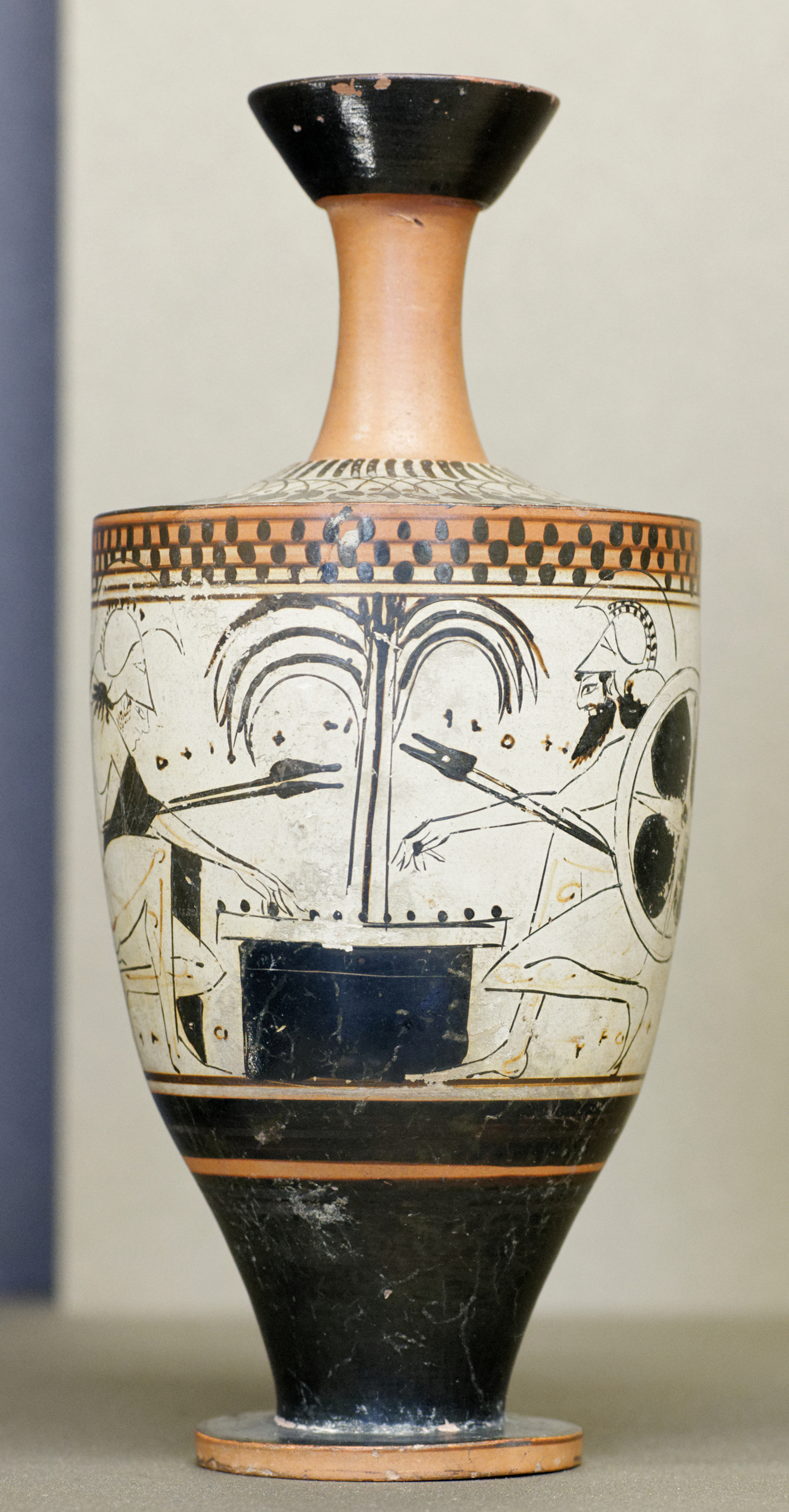
Achilles and Ajax playing a board game (Attic shoulder lekythos by the workshop of the Diosphos Painter, c. 500 BC)

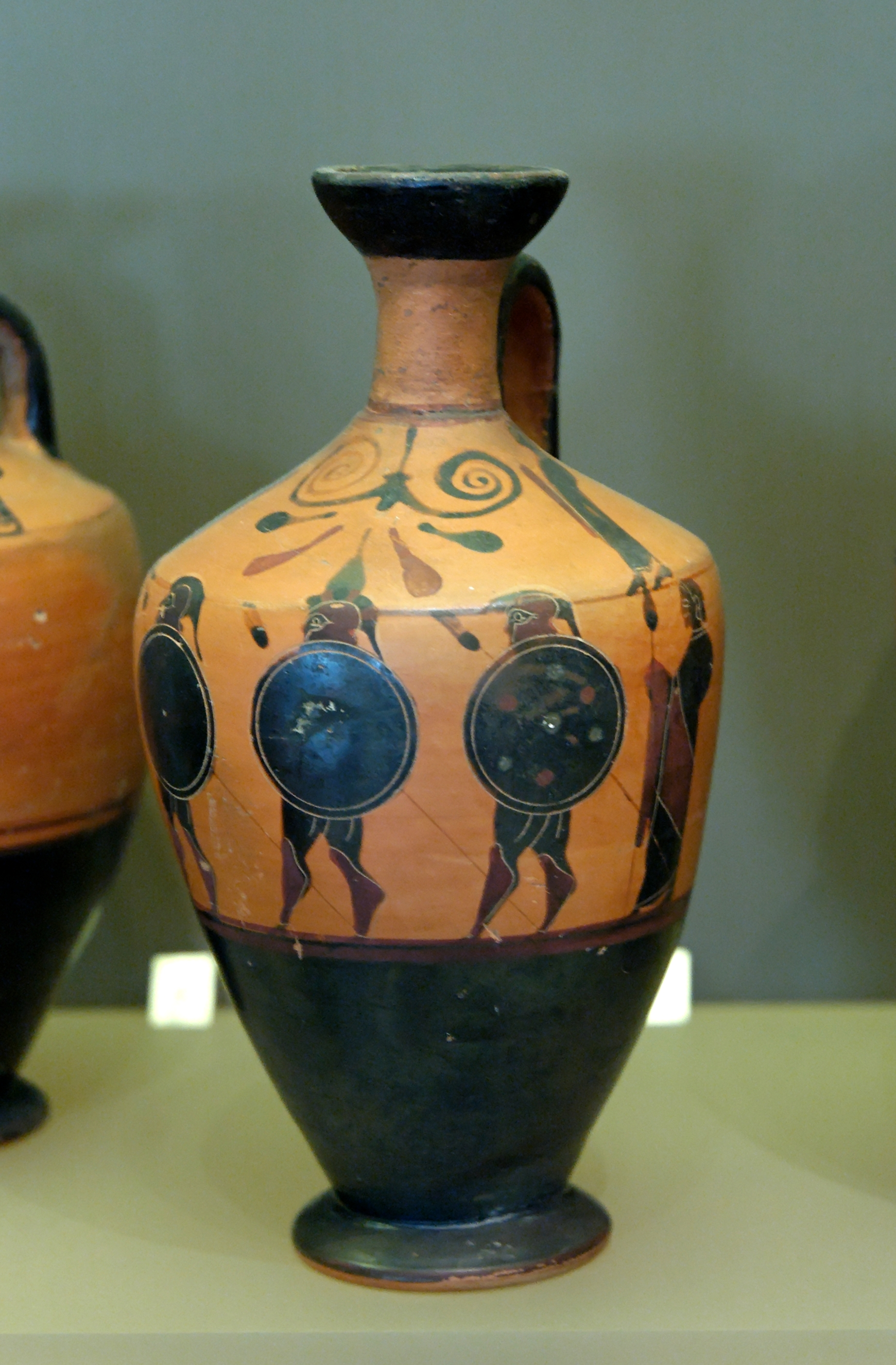
Shoulder lekythos

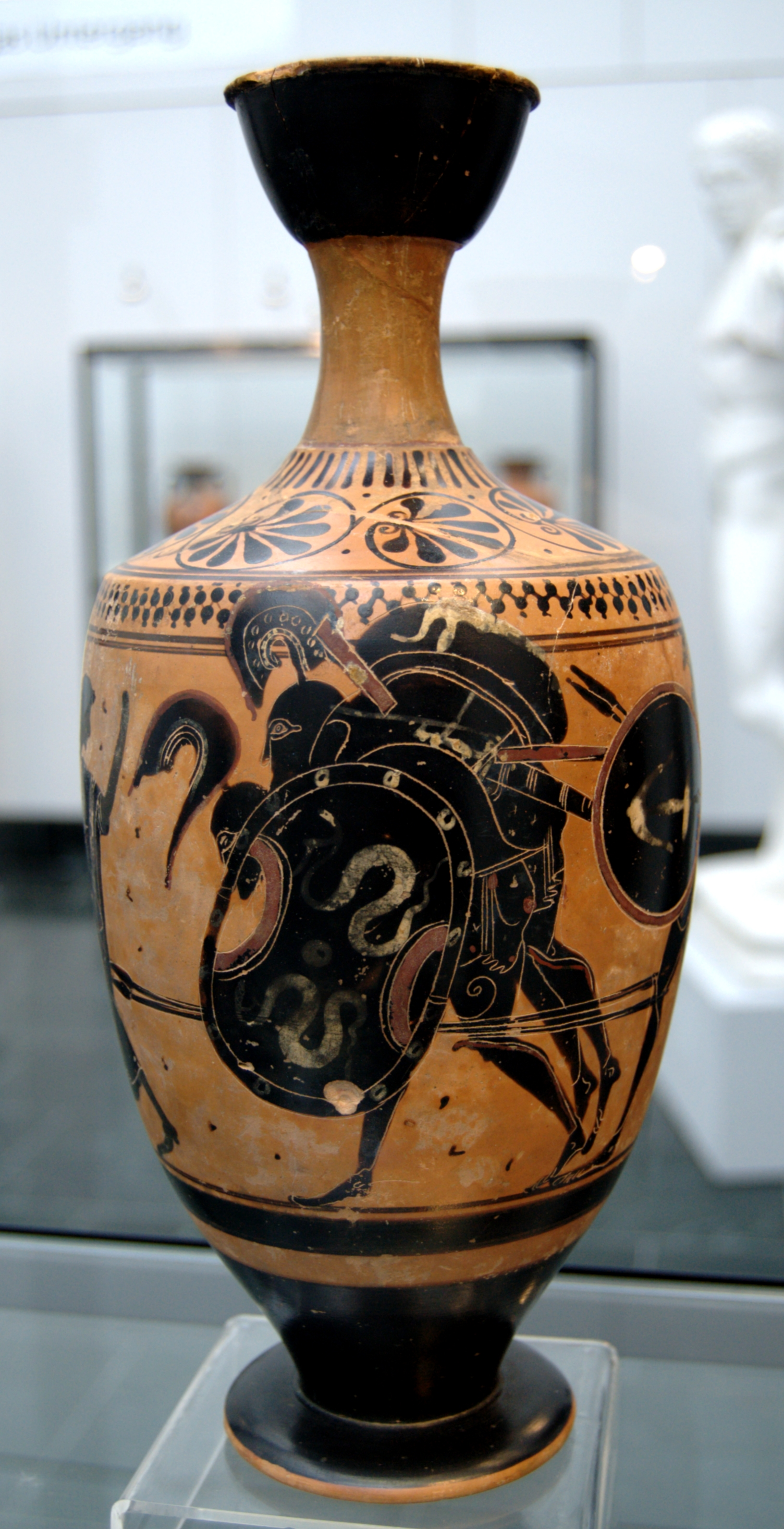
Shoulder lekythos, c. 510

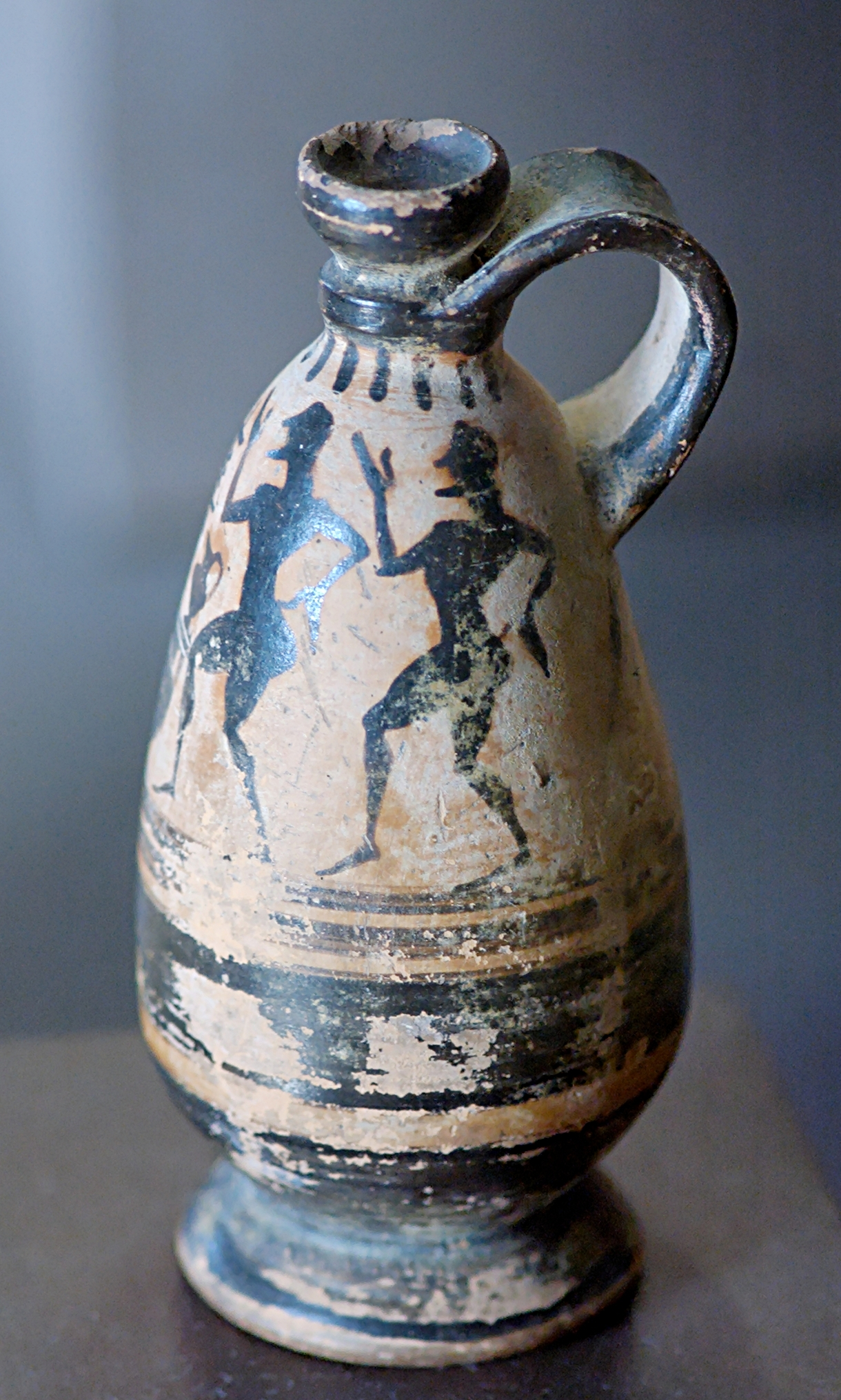
Deianeria lekythos

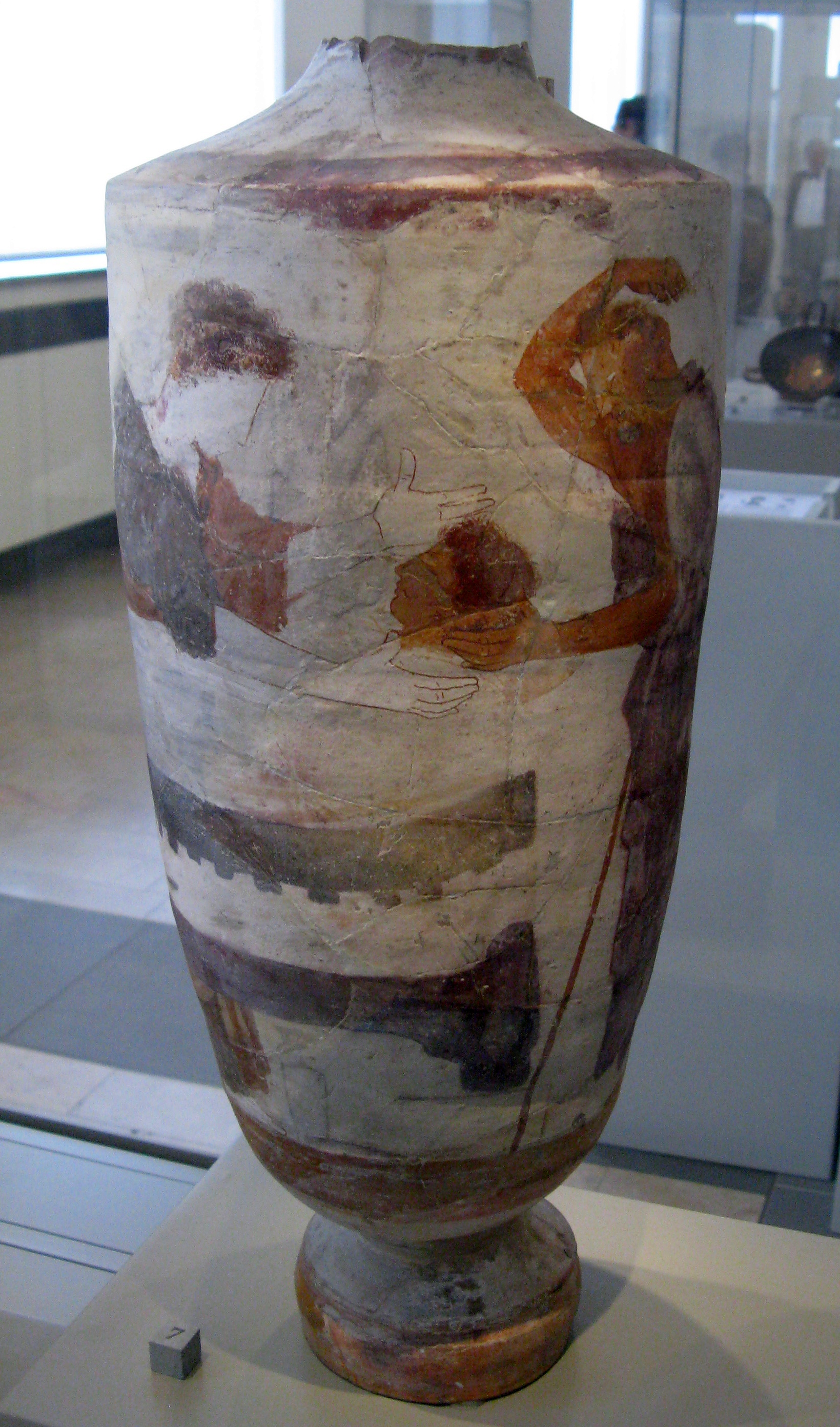
Prothesis (lying in repose) (attic plychrome lekythos (type V), from Alopeke, Group of the Huge Lekythoi, late 5th century BC)

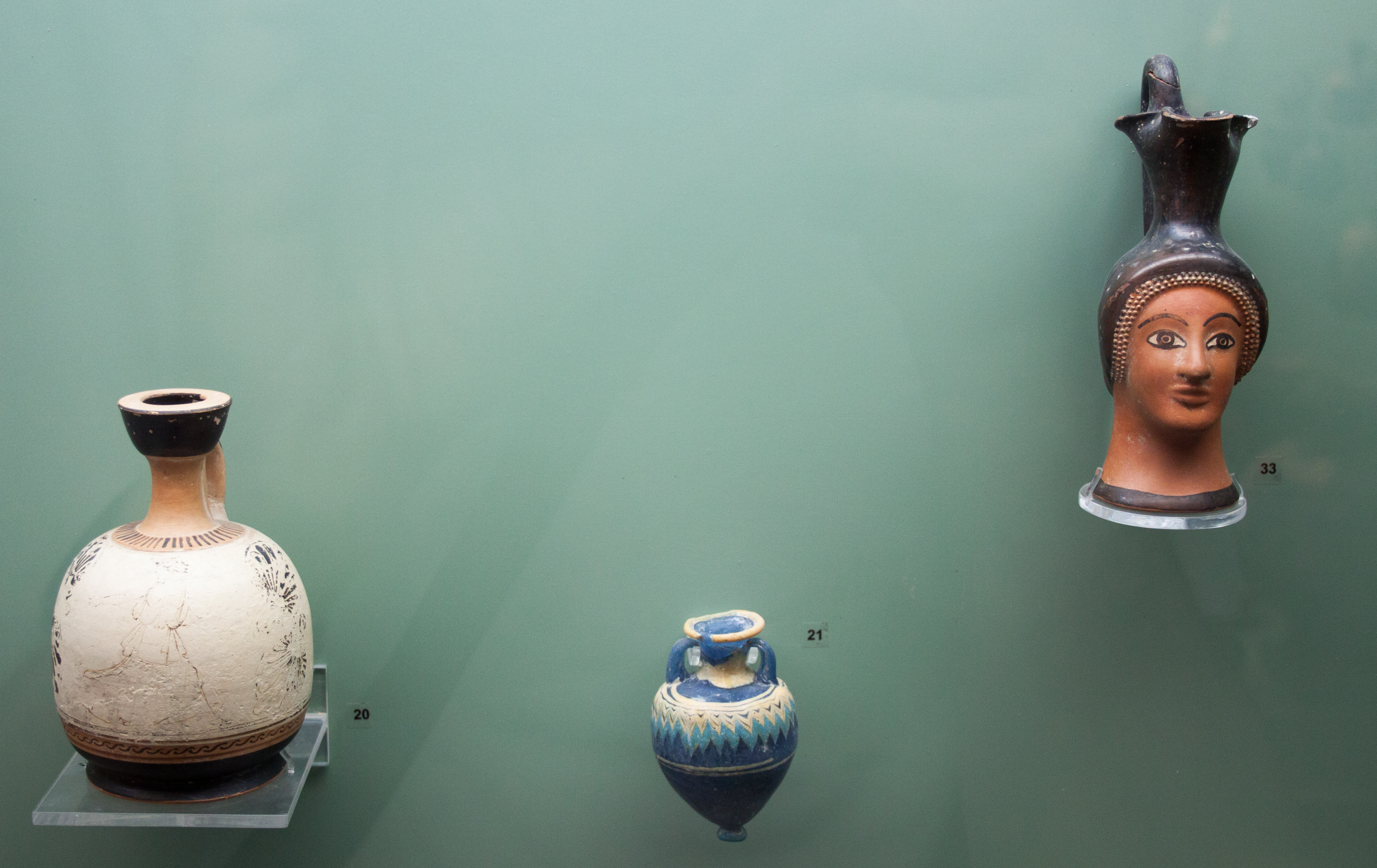
Squat (left) and plastic (right) shapes

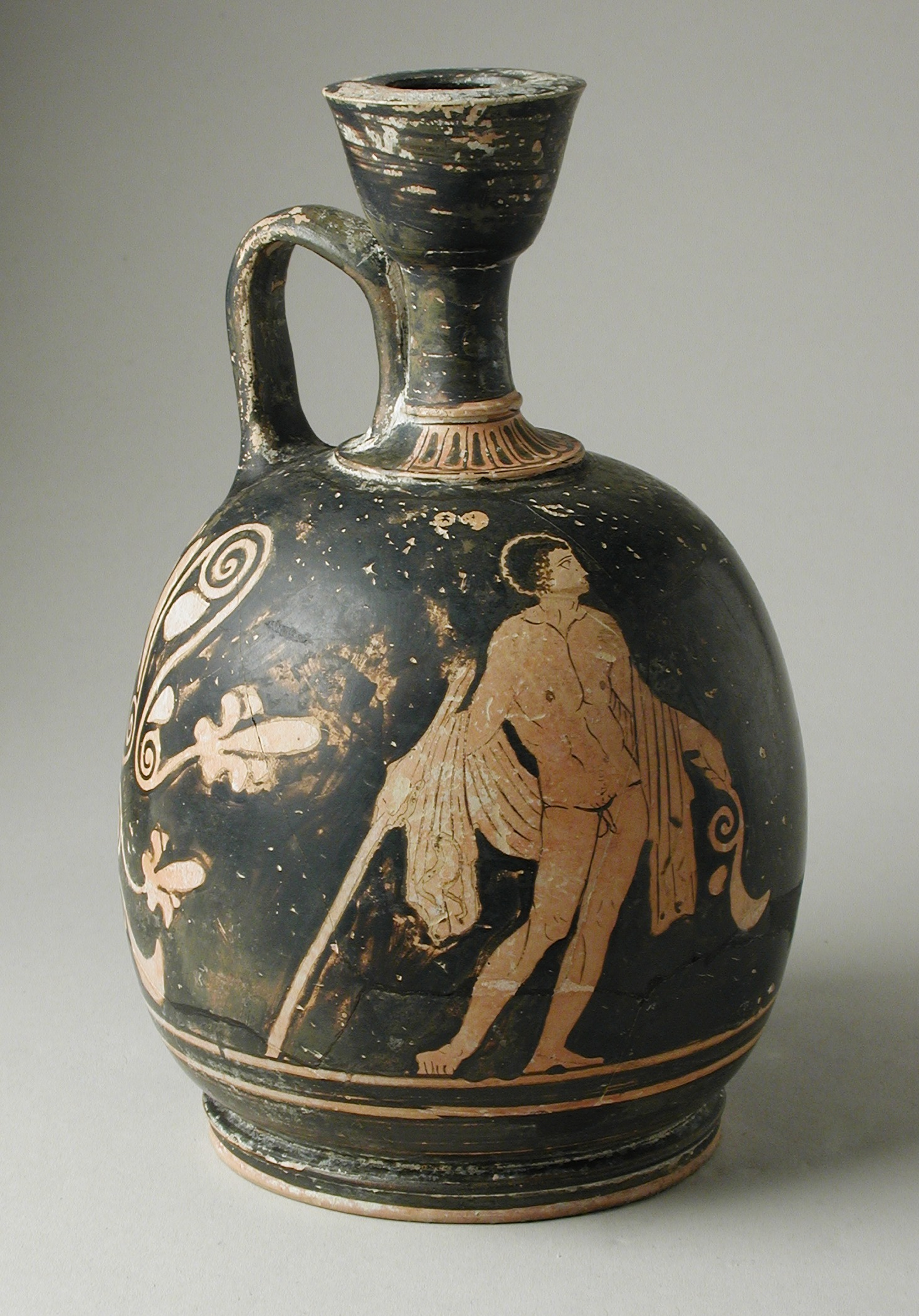
Squat type

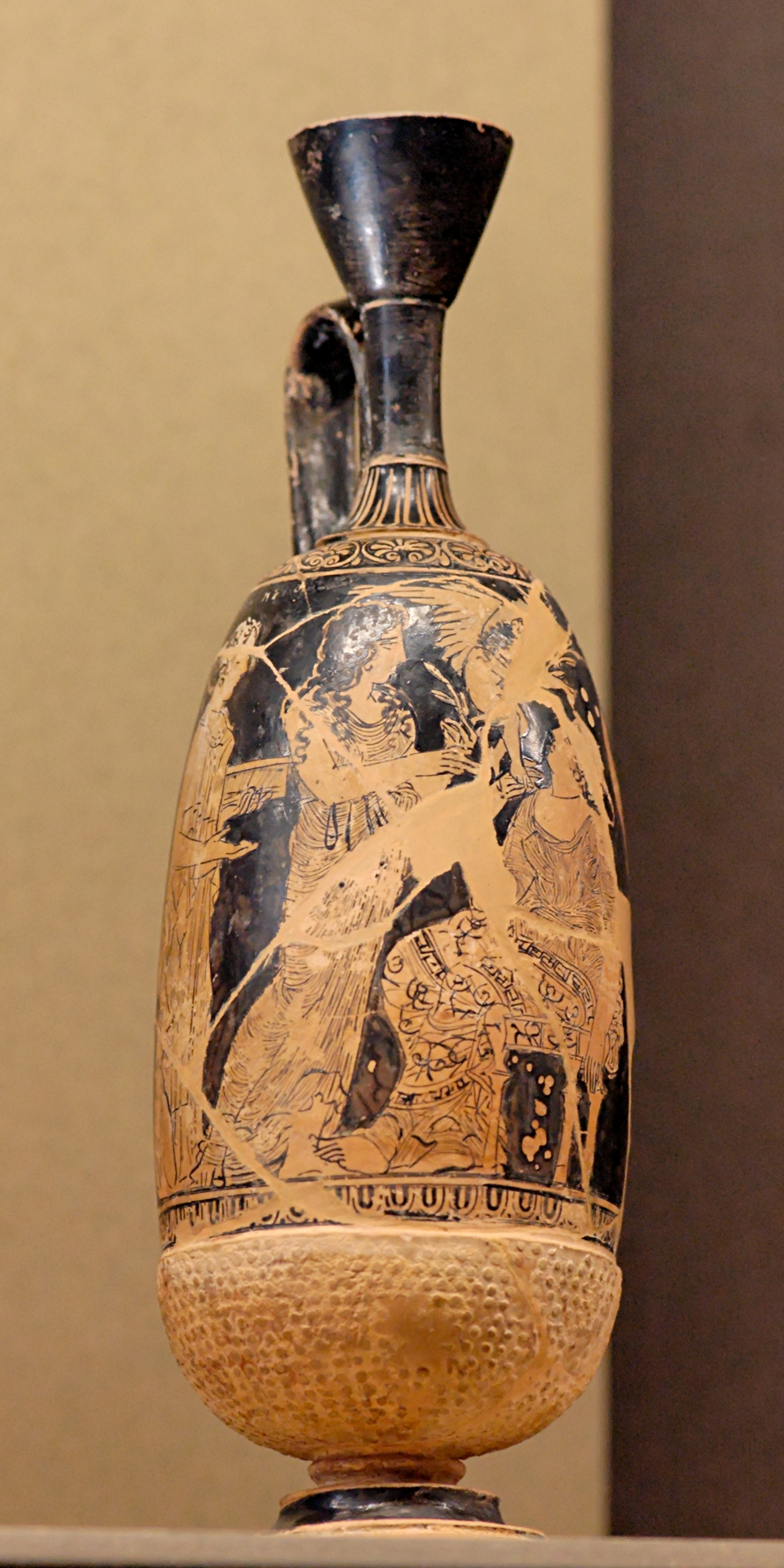
"Acorn" type, Louvre

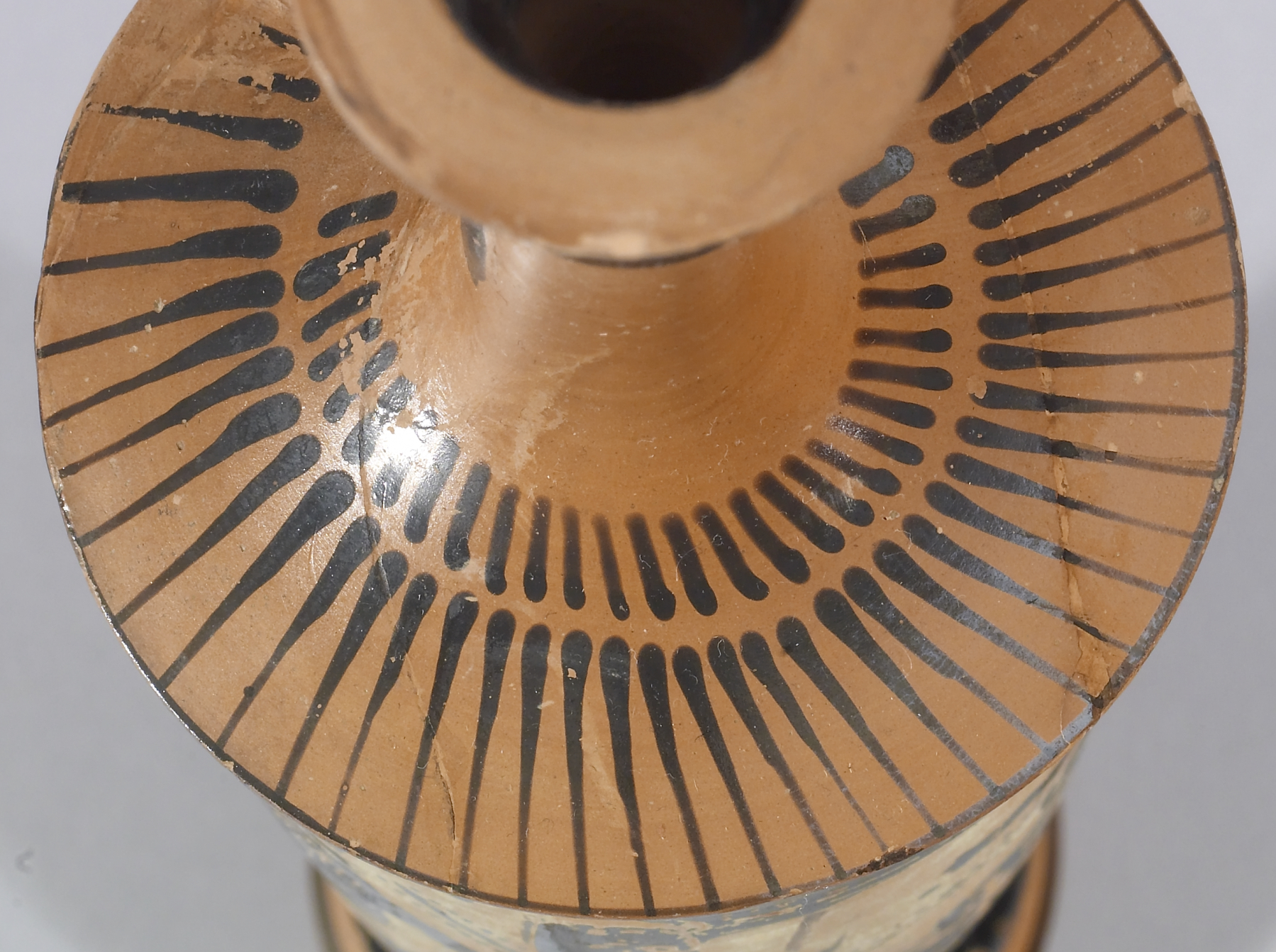
A view from above

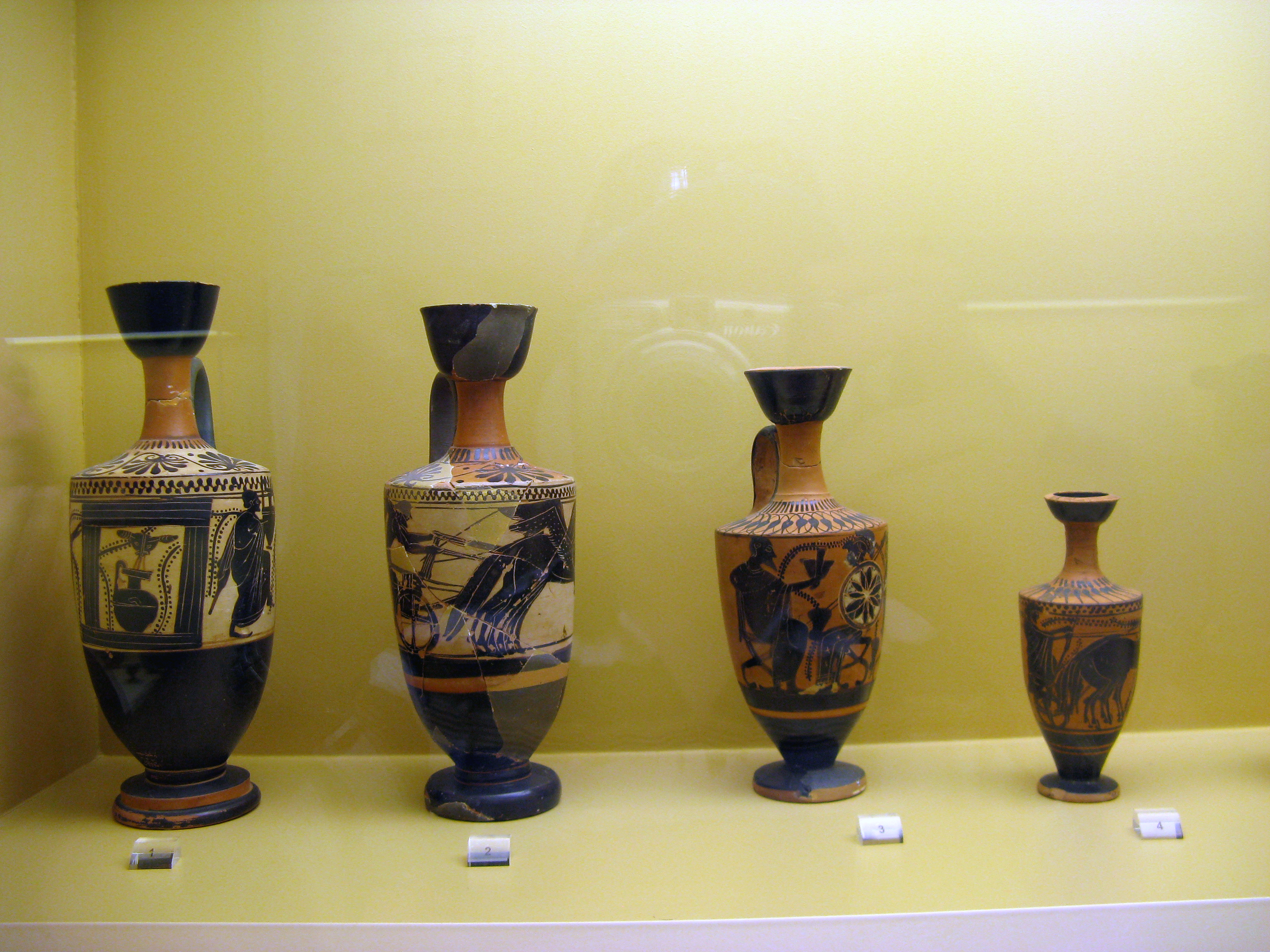
Group in Athens

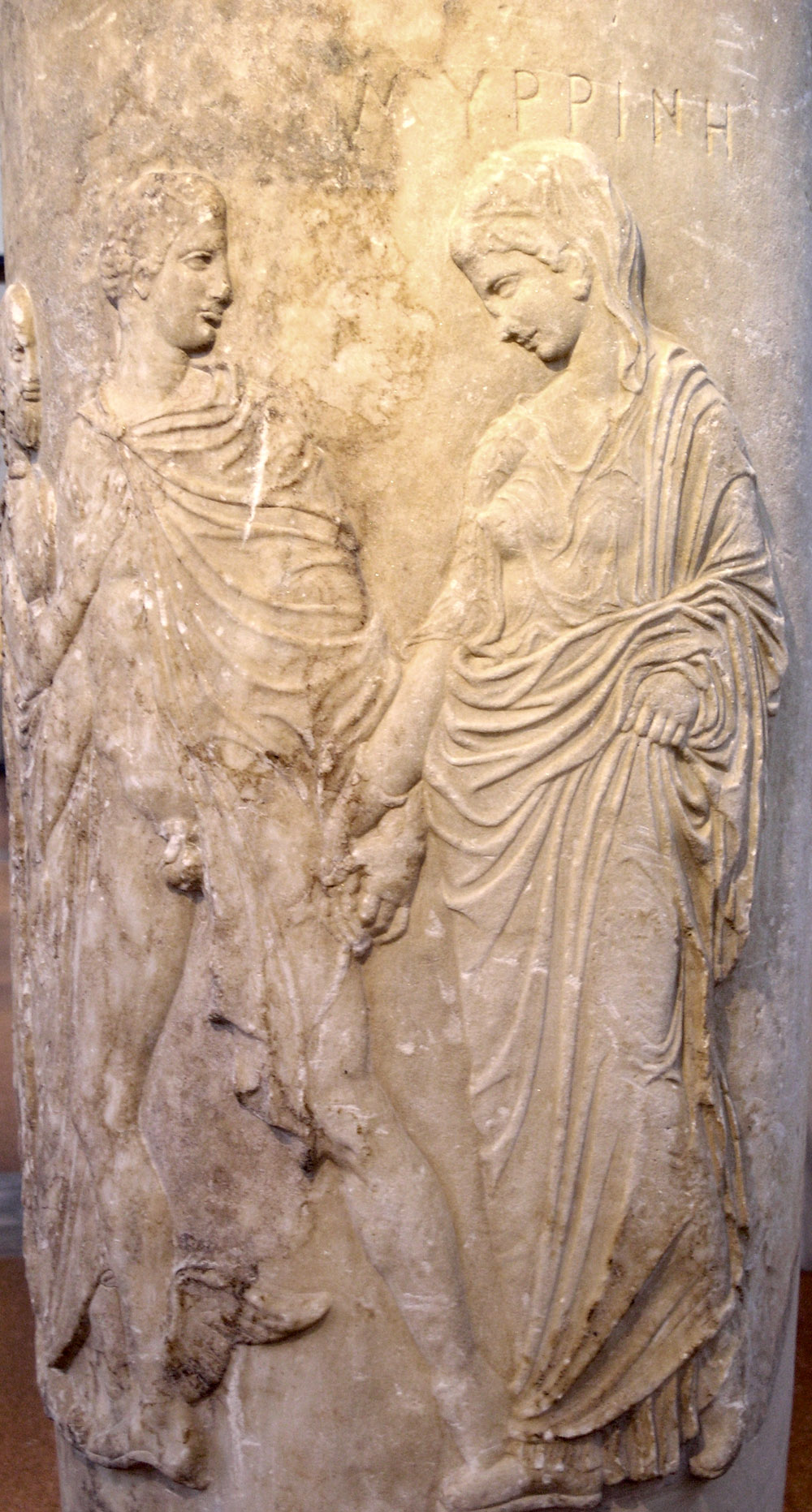
Relief from a carved funerary lekythos (National Archaeological Museum, Athens): Hermes conducts the deceased, Myrrhine, to Hades, c. 430–420 BC.

== See also ==
- Ancient Greek vase painting
- Corpus vasorum antiquorum
- Lekythion – lit. 'small lekythos', a metric pattern in poetry named after this type of vessel
- Loutrophoros
- Pottery of ancient Greece
- Reed Painter
