= Raffaello Romanelli =

Italian artist (1856–1928)

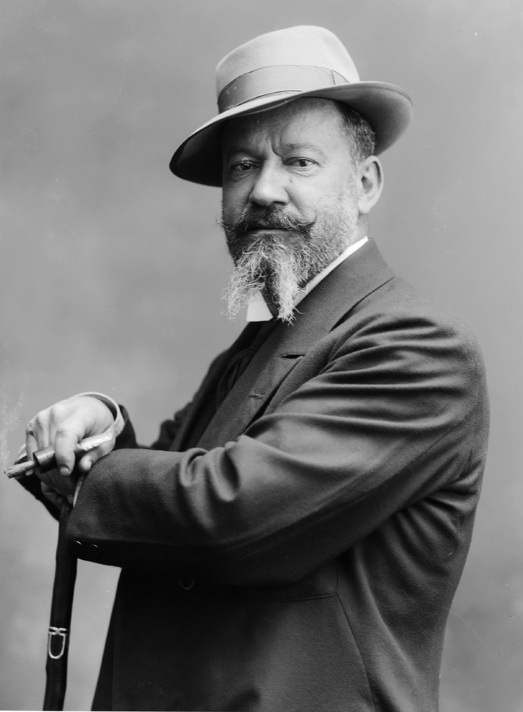
Raffaello Romanelli

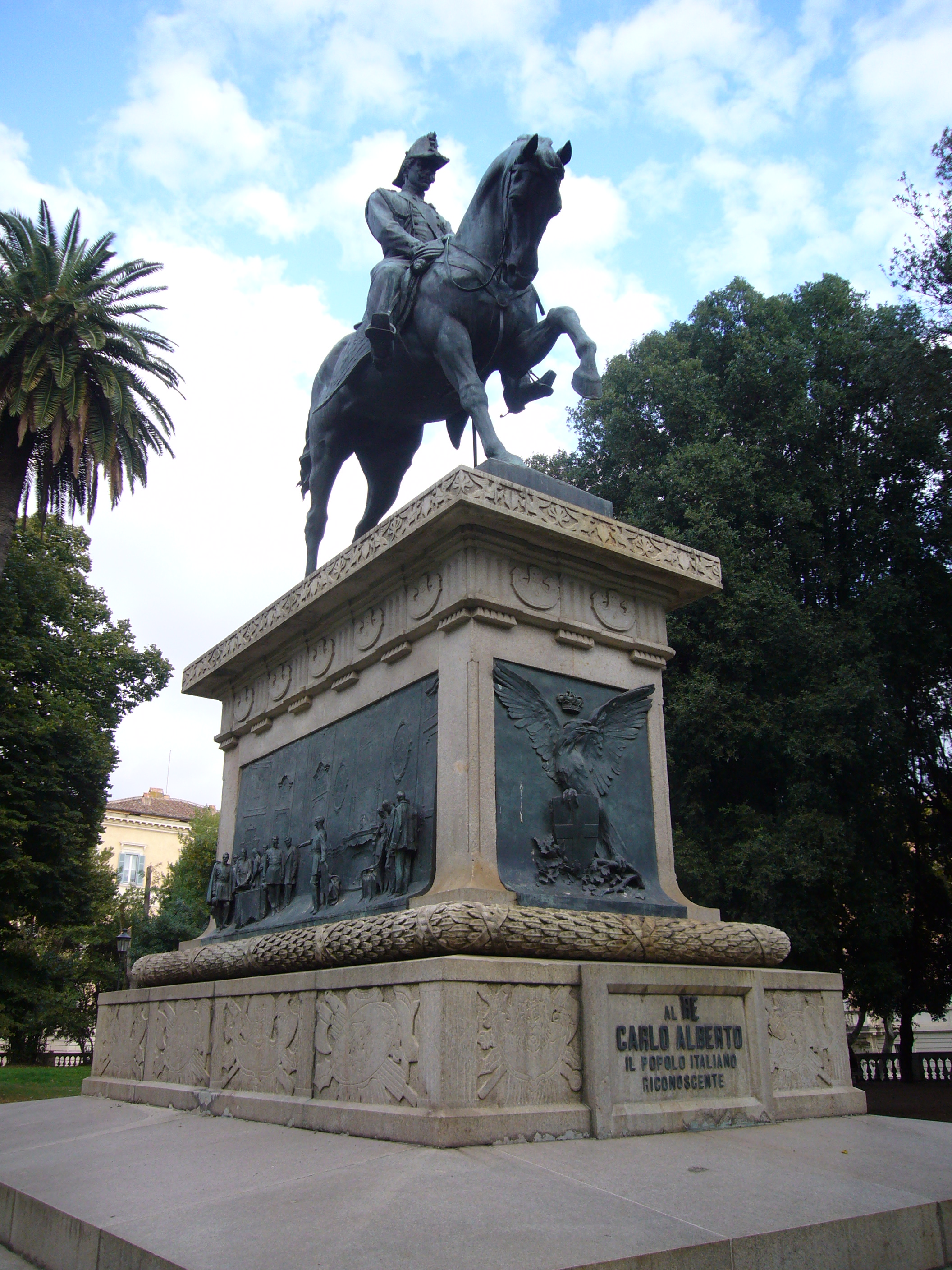
Romanelli's equestrian statue of Charles Albert of Sardinia in Rome

Raffaello Romanelli (13 May 1856 – 3 April 1928) was an Italian sculptor, born in Florence, Italy.

The son of Florentine sculptor Pasquale Romanelli, Raffaello is foremostly known for his monuments and portrait busts dedicated to noteworthy figures. He worked around the globe in America, Argentina, Austria, Cuba, England, France, Germany, Italy, Romania and Russia. Raffaello worked from two studios both located in the ‘Oltrarno’ district in Florence, initially from the family studio in Borgo San Frediano and then from a new one in Piazza Santo Spirito. Both studios were former churches. After being deconsecrated, they were converted into sculpture studios to make use of the ample space provided by the high ceilings. The atelier in Borgo San Frediano still houses the Romanelli Sculpture Studio and Gallery, an active studio with Raffaello's portraiture legacy being continued by his great-great-grandchildren.

== Personal life ==
=== Childhood ===
Born in Florence on May 13, 1856 to Pasquale Romanelli and his wife Elisa a descendant of Francesco Ferruccio, daughter of Vincenzo Mangoni, he was the fourth born of six children. From an early age Raffaello could be found in his father's studio, where he acquired the first skills of draughtsmanship. His first official work was the hand of Lorenzo Bartolini in marble, gifted to the Russian Princess Olga Orloff, a family friend of his parents.

=== Schooling ===
Raffaello's family spent their summers at Viareggio and here as a young boy Raffaello developed a longing to spend his life in the Navy. When Raffaello was fourteen, his father paid a large sum to the captain of a frigate to have his son taken on board and taken care of while sailing. After a few months Raffaello returned having matured and made up his mind to enroll himself at the Florence Academy. There he studied under Professor Augusto Rivalta and Emilio Zocchi. Whilst at the Academy, he continued his skills of marble working in his father's studio. He had a rebellious spirit but was extremely gifted and creative which earned him the silver medal for best in class along with the prize money which accompanied the award. His contemporaries at the school included Vittorio Matteo Corcos, later renowned portraitist who was participating in painting classes, and sculptor Gaetano Trentanove, an American sculptor attending sculpture classes.

=== Coming into his prime ===
In 1876, Raffaello at age twenty won the Annual Prize for Sculpture from the Academy, with his bas-relief of Jacob and Rachel at the Well. He finished his schooling in 1880 and in the same year won a national competition for his work L’Indemoniato che si Getta ai Piedi di Cristo – The Possessed Man Throwing Himself at Christ's Feet. That year he produced another work, the statue of the Roman hero, Caio Muzio Scævola; (524AC – 480AC circa). With this piece he won a scholarship to study for a year at the Rome Academy of Arts. The piece was later exhibited in the National Gallery of Fine arts in Florence. During this time he met Sofia Benini and they married in August 1881 at Florence's Palazzo Vecchio. He was twenty-five and she was twenty-two. In 1882, their first son was born, Romano Romanelli, who also grew up to become a famous sculptor.

== Career ==
=== Studio Borgo San Frediano ===
Soon he was given a room in his father studio and started working on commissions that his father passed on to him. One in particular which characterised these initial years was the portrait busts of Paolo Demidoff, his consort Princess Elena, and three of their children, Elim, Aurora, and Anatoly. Later in 1885 he would be commissioned by Princess Elena to create a memorial monument upon the death of Prince Paolo for the church of Saint Nicholas in Taghil in the Urals, where the gravestones of his ancestors were to be found. During these early days at the studio, Raffaello also became familiar with many of the locals of the San Frediano borough area, receiving commissions to make portrait busts. And so he began to build a reputation in the area. In 1884 he modelled the face of a San Frediano boy, Me ne Impipo, which is preserved in terracotta in the Galleria Romanelli.

=== Recognition in Florence ===
At the age of twenty-seven, Raffaello had the honour to be commissioned for two works for the facade of the Florence Cathedral (the Duomo). The figures were of Pope Leo the Great and Pierluigi of Palestrina.

In December 1886, Raffaello was nominated by the Florence Academy of Fine Arts an Honorary Academic.

After the death of his father in 1887, Raffaello took over direction of the studio in Borgo San Frediano, whilst his brother continued the administration of the art gallery on Lungarno Acciaiuoli. He made a portrait bust, which can be found in the cemetery of Porte Sante, to commemorate his father. The bust sits on a granite column at the bottom of which leans an angel.

While working in the studio of San Frediano, Raffaello's fame grew to surpass that of his father, both in Italy and internationally. In December 1888, the Florence Academy of Fine Arts elevated him to Accademico Corrispondente. Then, in 1892 he was made a Professor of the Academy.

=== The Era of National Works – statesmen, political figures ===
From 1890 Raffaello began to work on very important commissions both nationally and internationally. Raffaello's popularity was growing at such a significant pace that from 1894 he had to rent a second studio in Santo Spirito to make space for production. Winning the competition to make a monument dedicated to Giuseppe Garibaldi, the Italian General and politician who played a large role in the unification of Italy, for Siena had made this need greater. This was one of many national commissions completed by Raffaello, it was acquired by the city council of Siena to honour Garibaldi. Raffaello's sketch submitted in 1890 for the project was met with unanimous appraisal from the committee members for the simplicity of the pose and its modern outlook. The principal contestants Romanelli was up against were Zocchi, Calzolari, Frenguelli and Pozzi. After three meetings the committee finally settled on Raffaello. The piece was completed by 1896 and in the same year Raffaello set to work on a monument dedicated to Donatello for the Basilica of San Lorenzo in Florence. Donatello was the most important early Renaissance sculptor, goldsmith and designer. During Raffaello's lifetime he had made many commemorative monuments to important figures, this one was a particular honour for Raffaello.

Raffaello's next pieces of work to emerge around this time were centred around Ubaldino Peruzzi, Mayor of Florence and one of Italy's first ministers, a reputed political figure Raffaello had known well. Raffaello portrays him in four bas-reliefs which document notable moments in his political life. One of which was the inauguration of the positioning of Michelangelo’s the statue David in Piazzale Michelangelo in 1875. The piece shows important figures of Florentine society gathered to honour the great renaissance artist, among them Peruzzi. Following a similar theme, in 1899 Raffaello completed the bronze of the Marquess Cosimo Ridolfi, which stands in Piazza Santo Spirito in Florence. The Marquess was an agronomist and politician, deemed one of the most learned Tuscan men of his era, heralded as the man responsible for spreading modern agriculture in Italy. In 1829 he had founded the Municipal Savings Bank of Florence and was president of the historic Accademia dei Georgofili for 23 years. He was an ambassador in both London and Paris. Raffaello portrays him standing with a book in his hands. The unveiling of the statue took place in 1898, 50 years since the proclamation of King Carlo Alberto’s constitution and the 32nd anniversary of the Marquess Ridolfi's death.

In 1900, on March 14, in via del Quirinale, Rome, the bronze equestrian statue dedicated to King Carlo Alberto of Piedmont-Sardinia was unveiled in the presence of King Umberto I and Queen Margherita. The horse is represented as brought to a standstill and pawing the ground impatiently, while the King is pensive in his General's uniform siting elegantly on its back. The pedestal is adorned with two bas-reliefs, one representing the Victory at Goito and the other the Abdication at Novara. The monument was intended to mark the centennial anniversary of his birth.

Another important Florentine figure immortalised by Raffaello's hands was Florentine Benvenuto Cellini, whose bronze bust stands in the middle of the Eastern side of Florence's Ponte Vecchio. It was commissioned in 1900 by the famous goldsmiths of the bridge to mark the fourth century since his birth and honour him as one of the great artists of their trade. Cellini was a great master goldsmith and a reputed sculptor of the 1500s.

Raffaello's greatest commission in Italy came in 1914 from the Roman Curia requesting a portrait of Pope Benedict XV to adorn the head of diocese. The Pope had never before accepted to pose for a portrait and exceptionally posed for Raffaello on three separate days, an unheard event at the time. Raffaello intellect and erudite conversation encouraged the Pope to be at ease, talking, moving enabling Raffaello to discern his personality. War in Europe had just started, and whilst Italy was not yet involved, the Pope was clearly anxious, trying to advocate peace. The results of the artist's time with the Pope were two statues, one of the Pope sitting and one of him standing.

In 1923 Raffaello unveiled another equestrian statue, this time dedicated to Francesco Ferrucci, a famous Florentine Military Commissioner of the Medici family much celebrated as a brave Florentine war hero and ancestor to Raffaello's wife.

Raffaello made several war memorials, in 1892 to remember the Fallen Students of the Battle of Curtatone at Montanara, Siena. Another example is the plaque he sculpted for the Fallen at the Battle of Piombino. Following on this theme are the many funeral monuments he made for cemeteries such as the ones to his father Pasquale, Prince Paolo Demidoff, Gaetano Leopardi, the Wernke Monument to name but a few. He was also commissioned to make a plaque honouring the famous Italian poet Giosuè Carducci.

=== Russia and Romania ===
In 1913 Raffaello won a competition out of 142 competitors to make the monument dedicated to Tsar Alexander II, Russia's Emperor, King of Poland and Grand Duke of Finland. This is one of the largest monuments in Europe.

Raffaello already had links with Russia and had visited St Petersburg in 1901 to admire the artwork at the Hermitage Museum, notably that of Antonio Canova and Lorenzo Bartolini. Around this time he was commissioned to create the portrait busts of two opera singers of the Imperial court, the tenor Nicolaj Nicolaevic Figner and his Florentine born wife the soprano Medea Mei Figner. He returned again in 1912, taking part in a competition to create the prestigious monument dedicated to Tsar Alexander II. The cousin of the Tsar and the president of the commission for the monument came to Florence in 1914 to establish the terms of contract and to name Raffaello as the victor.

He also worked profusely for the royal court and government officials in Romania. This initiated with a request from Bucharest in 1900 from the Conservative Party who wanted to erect a monument in memory of Barbu Catargiu in Mitropliei Place where he had been assassinated. A loyal follower of Prince Cuza, Catargiu had been the first prime minister of the national government in 1866. Raffaello portrayed him sitting in an armchair with the figure of a woman by his side. Following this commission more work from Romania came Raffaello's way. He built a close friendship with King Carol I (born Prince Karl of Hohenzollern-Sigmaringen) and his wife Queen Elizabeth of Wied (widely known by her literary name: Carmen Sylva). He produced a marble bust of King Carol I dressed in military uniform wearing decorations and later in 1907 another bronze statue of King Carol l, this time on horseback, once again in military attire. In this same period he made a bas-relief for Queen Elizabeth as well as her portrait bust and that of Queen Victoria’s granddaughter Princess Maria of Edinburgh, who had become the wife of King Carol I's nephew, the future King Ferdinand I of Romania. He was also commissioned to sculpt many portrait busts: of painters, lawyers, ministers and often their wives as well. Between 1907 and 1913 Raffaello made numerous decorative pieces for gardens, such as fountains carved in marble. He also received the commission to make several memorial monuments, as the one in the city of Iasi, dedicated to the Prince of Moldavia and Valacchia Alexander Cuza, who had been the founder of the independent Romanian state.

=== The Americas ===
At the outbreak of the First World War Raffaello turned his interests to the United States. The opportunity to do so came about from the invitation to take part in the 1915 Panama–Pacific International Exposition in San Francisco. This drew interest to his work. Consequently, at the end of the war Raffaello was commissioned to make a Mausoleum in memory of Verner Zevola Reed, Colorado's wealthiest businessman. An important work, which was created between 1919 and 1923 in Florence and then shipped and assembled in America. Perhaps his most challenging work. Among several portrait busts, he made a bust of William Penn in Philadelphia and in 1927 the Bust of Dante for Detroit. This commission was requested by the Italian Community in Detroit to celebrate the sixth century from Dante’s death. Raffaello worked a lot in Kansas City where there is a park named after him, the Romanelli Garden. Several Romanelli sculptures decorate the city, some original models by Raffaello; others were produced and sold by his studio from its vast collection of plaster models. His craft also took him to Cuba where Raffaello created for the Aspuro family the bronze door for a chapel entrance in memory of Christopher Columbus. Then to Puerto Rico, where Raffaello created the Tomb for the Ferrer Family, another magnificent memorial monument.

=== Twilight Years ===
Raffaello was a tireless worker, besides his monuments and portraits he created numerous small and medium-sized works of the most varied subjects, religious, allegorical, everyday imagery and animals. It is thought that his production totals more than 2,300 works. During his lifetime he exhibited in Florence, Milan, Turin, Paris, San Francisco, and St. Louis, Missouri. He worked up until his death in April 1928, passing on the studio to his son Romano Romanelli and his unfinished commissions, the biggest being the monument for Louis Botha, for South Africa. Raffaello had won the competition to execute it in 1926.

== Style and influences ==
=== Marble vs bronze ===
He grew up amongst marble sculptors, his father Pasquale and mentor Lorenzo Bartolini rarely used bronze. Marble was the preferred choice of material for the way in which it reflected light. Near the end of the 1800s creating Bronze statues for open air spaces came into fashion. Raffaello therefore had to learn the techniques required for casting sculptures in bronze. In particularly he had to learn how to work with coloured wax, because his clay sculptures were transformed at the foundry into wax models which then needed to be worked on before the fusion. Raffaello worked with both marble and bronze during his career.

=== Characteristics of Raffaello’s work ===
His traditional training had taught him to seek inspiration from classical sculpture but, similarly to his father Pasquale, the most important characteristic of Raffaello's work is its realism: he sought to portray with great accuracy his subject matter, looking to replicate natural states of being. He drew inspiration from scenes of everyday life and often picked his models from the local people residing in the studio's neighbourhood.

Raffaello was primarily a renowned portraitist of great esteem; he knew how to capture the spirit of his subject, their manner, style, expression and character. He possessed the ability to expose the rawness of his subject, which had made him immediately famous from the time of his training. He preferred for his models to talk and move to enable him to create a lively similarity.

During his long career, he made portraits globally of Kings and Popes, nobles and bourgeoisie. The Ambrosano family were great admirers of Raffaello's portraiture. The 1903 bronze figure of George Flood France is a good example of his portrait skills. The work was made for Oxford University and it is now exhibited in the permanent collection at the Ashmolean Museum. His 1900 bust of Princess Marina Borghese named Iris Florentina decorated with the flowers symbolising the city of Florence is one of his most celebrated pieces (National Gallery of Modern Art, Rome). The fine attention to details is a typical feature of his work: he showed the same attention to detail whether making a portrait or a decorative piece such as the various statues and fountains he made to decorate gardens for which he took inspiration from the Renaissance and the Florentine Baroque periods. During his later years, Raffaello's style reflected the climate of the Liberty style, especially with regards to the female form.

=== Religious symbolism ===
Many of Raffaello's pieces allude to religious imagery. The Nazarene in bronze, a figure of Christ to be found in Moscow, the 1899 Christ and the Blindman in the Cemetery of Bari, Bust of a woman with cupid in Bangkok commissioned by the sovereign Chulalongkorn the Great, King Rama V, the fifth monarch of Siam. As well as The Fountain of Angels in bronze, 1902, in St. Louis (MO), made for a competition. The angel has a feminine face, open arms and holds two objects from which water flows out. The judging Jury awarded him the Grand Prix, beating the likes of Lucio Fontana, Augusto Rivalta, Achille D'Orsi and Galletti.

== Exhibitions (during his lifetime) ==
- 1887, National Exhibition of Belle Arti, Torino, busts Ciociara and Falconiere
- 1888, Paris Exhibition, spring/summer, busts Giacobbe e Rachele
- 1889, Universal Exhibition, Paris (aged only 30, Raffaello was elected to be the Italian juryman in the art section of the Paris exhibition. It was the most important world fair of the century)
- 1900, Grand Palais, plaster copy of the Carlo Alberto monument, bronze portraits of the sixteenth-century architect Jean Aicard and M. Reinach, Christ looking to the sky
- 1897, March, Mostra di Arte e Fiori, Fine Arts Society
- 1904, Expo of Saint Louis, Missouri, Christ and the blindman, Iris Fontana
- 1905, first tuscan art exhibition organised by Domenico Trentascoste, Eduardo Gelli (Galleria Romanelli), Francesco Colzi and Signora Spagnuola
- 1906, International Exhibition, Milan, Cristo che ridona la vista al cieco, Pittore Gelli
- 1907, Venice Biennale, Iris Florentina
- 1915, Panama Pacific International Exhibition, San Francisco, Christianity emerging from paganism ("the Statue is the work of Raffaello Romanelli, who is to Italy what Rodin is to France. It is the largest piece of marble at the Exposition", San Francisco Chronicle, July 4, 1915)
- 1926, Primaverile Florentine

== Principal works ==
- Marble Hand of Lorenzo Bartolini (1871)
- Gaio Muzio Scevola (1880, Gallery of the Academy of Fine Arts, Florence)
- Memorial Monument to Prince Paolo Demidoff (1882, Kiev)
- Memorial Monument to Pasquale (1887, Florence)
- Statue of Giuseppe Montanelli (1892)
- Equestrian Statue of Garibaldi (1896, Siena)
- Cenotaph of Donatello (1896, Basilica di San Lorenzo, Florence)
- Statue of Marquess Cosimo Ridolfo (1899, Basilica di Santo Spirito, Florence)
- Equestrian Monument for King Carlo Alberto (1900, giardini del Palazzo del Quirinale, Rome)
- Portrait Bust of Benvenuto Cellini (1901, Ponte Vecchio, Florence)
- Fountain of Angels (1902, St. Louis, Botanical Gardens, Missouri, USA)
- Statue of John Wister (1903, Philadelphia)
- Statue of Condottiero dei Dorobanti (1907, Turnu Măgurele, Romania)
- Statue of Mihail Kogălniceanu (1911, Iaşi, Romania)
- Statue of Alexandru Ioan Cuza (1912, Iaşi, Romania)
- Marble Statue of King Carol I of Romania (1913, Peles Castle, Romania)
- Portrait bust of Pope Benedict XV (1915, ....)
- Statue of Tsar Alexander II (1915, Russia)
- Cleopatra and Mercury (1916, Golden Gate Park Memorial Museum, San Francisco)
- Portrait bust of Dante Alighieri (1927, Detroit)
- Replica Medici lions at the Bridge of Lions (1927, St. Augustine, Florida)
