= Monument of Liberty, Ruse =

Monument of Liberty
- Паметник на свободата (Bulgarian)
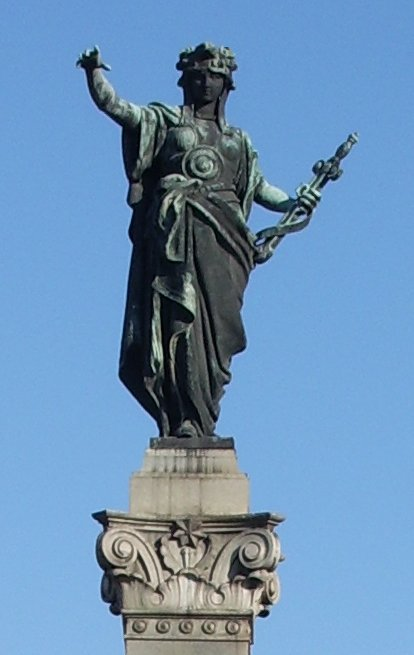
- The Monument of Liberty in Rousse, Bulgaria.
- Interactive map of Monument of Liberty
- Location: Ruse, Bulgaria
- Coordinates: 43°50′55.3″N 25°57′12.5″E
- Designer: Arnoldo Zocchi
- Type: statue
- Height: 17.8 metres (58 ft)
- Completion date: Between 1906 and 1909

The Monument of Liberty (Bulgarian: Паметник на свободата, Pametnik na svobodata) in Rousse, Bulgaria, was built at the beginning of the 20th century by the Italian sculptor Arnoldo Zocchi. As time went by, it gained significance as one of the city's symbols, and now forms a part of her coat of arms.

== Design ==
The structure is a pyramidal one. The statue on top represents a female figure, who is holding a sword in her left hand, while pointing with her right hand northwest in the direction of the free peoples of Europe, to which Bulgaria strived to belong following liberation and formal recognition in 1908. One of the two bronze lions at the base is tearing the yoke chains with his mouth, whilst the other defends the Shield of Freedom. There are reliefs of resistance scenes on the pedestal. Two cannons are placed at the rear.

== History ==
The exact year of opening is not known for certain — 1906, 1908, and 1909 have been suggested, based on labels, photographs, and the Encyclopedia of fine arts in Bulgaria (Bulgarian: Енциклопедия на изобразителните изкуства в България). All sources cite the date 11 August, though. The booklet The revolutionaries' monument in Rousse claims to have proven that the correct year is 1909.

The fundamental stone was put in 1890 in the Youth Park, where it was inaugurated by mitropolit Grigoriy in the presence of knyaz Ferdinand I. Five years later, the municipality and the organization of resistance heroes decided to move the place of the monument to the city garden, a former Turkish cemetery, which had been transformed into the city's new central square. At that time, the garden had an iron fence and used to be locked at night. The square was initially named Knyaz Boris after the recently born successor of the throne. After the monument's construction was completed, it was renamed to Botev square, then after 9 September 1944, when the communists came to power, it became the Lenin square, and later finally got its present name — the Freedom square.

In the end of 1895, a contract was signed with Stoycho Raychev Kefsizov, a local entrepreneur and former revolutionary, to build the monument for 65,000 leva. Despite Kefsizov's energy and devotion, the money did not suffice and the remainder to the new cost of 150,000 leva had to be collected as voluntary donations from evening balls all over Bulgaria. The Simeonovi brothers (Ivan Simeonov and Stefan Simeonov), who were famous innovative bankers, rendered a decisive support of 50,000 leva.

The initial design by architect Simeon Zlatev featured a statue of the "Tsar Liberator" (Alexander II of Russia) on top, and two statues of revolutionaries with guns at the base. In 1907 the Rousse society decided to replace the tsar's statue with a statue of a woman, symbolizing freedom, in order not to resemble the Monument to the Tsar Liberator in Sofia, opened in the same year and also a work of Arnoldo Zocchi.

Ferdinand I, who had shortly been re-titled from a knyaz to a tsar after the Unification of Bulgaria, was asked to determine the monument's opening day. He didn't reply, so 11 August was chosen, as it was the climax date of the Battle of Shipka. The ceremony started three days earlier. It was attended by many former revolutionaries' from other Bulgarian cities, including Rayna Knyaginya, as well as by officials, such as the prime minister Aleksandar Malinov, the ministers of justice and of foreign affairs, military generals, religious leaders, and the Russian consul. Tsar Ferdinand I only sent a representative, possibly because of the difficult relations between Russia and the throne.

== Sources ==
- Lebikyan, Hachik (2002). The revolutionaries' monument in Rousse. ISBN 978-954-9906-48-6.

(Лебикян, Хачик (2002). Archaic Bulgarian: Опълченския памятникъ въ Руссе. ISBN 978-954-9906-48-6.)

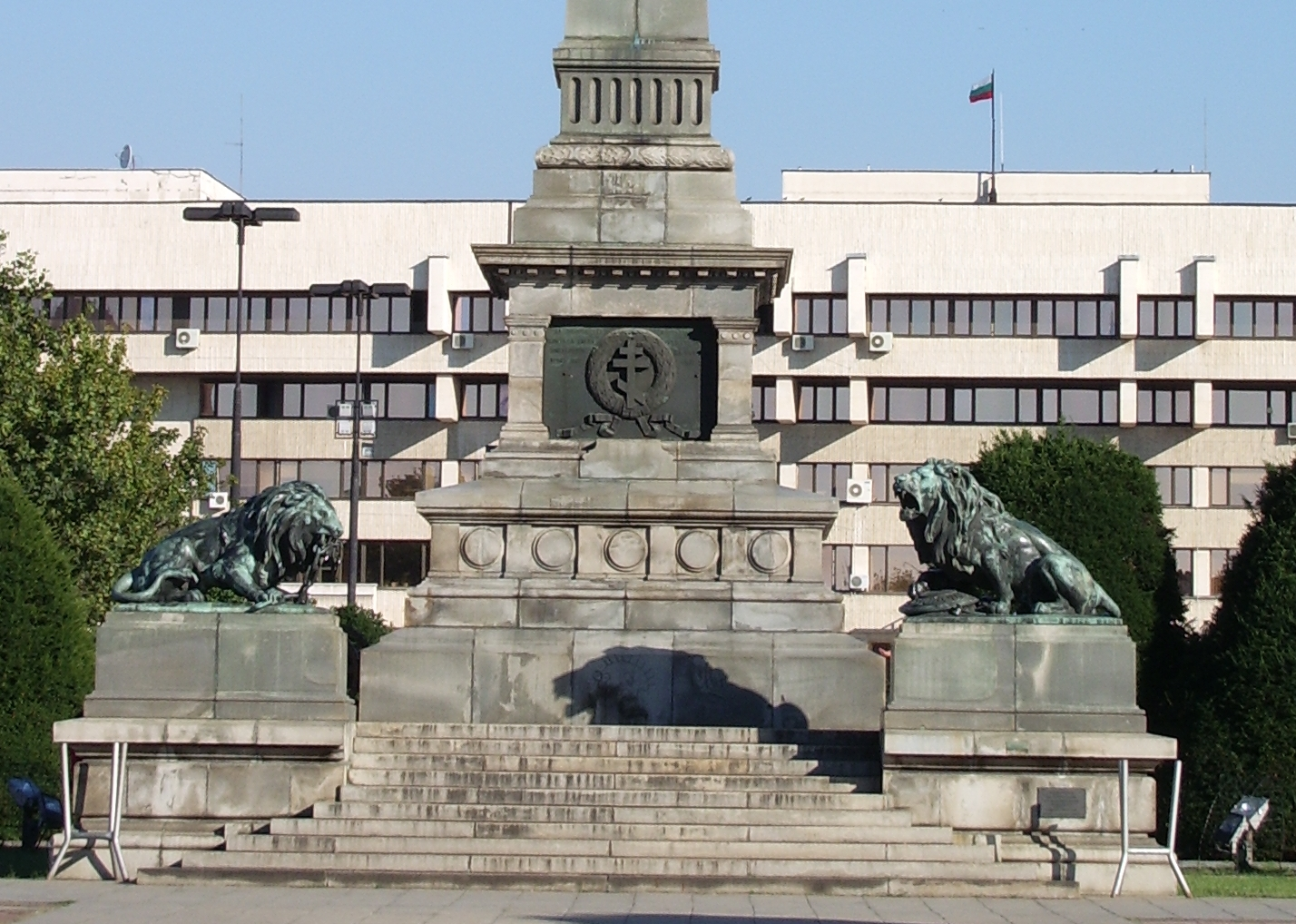
Pedestal

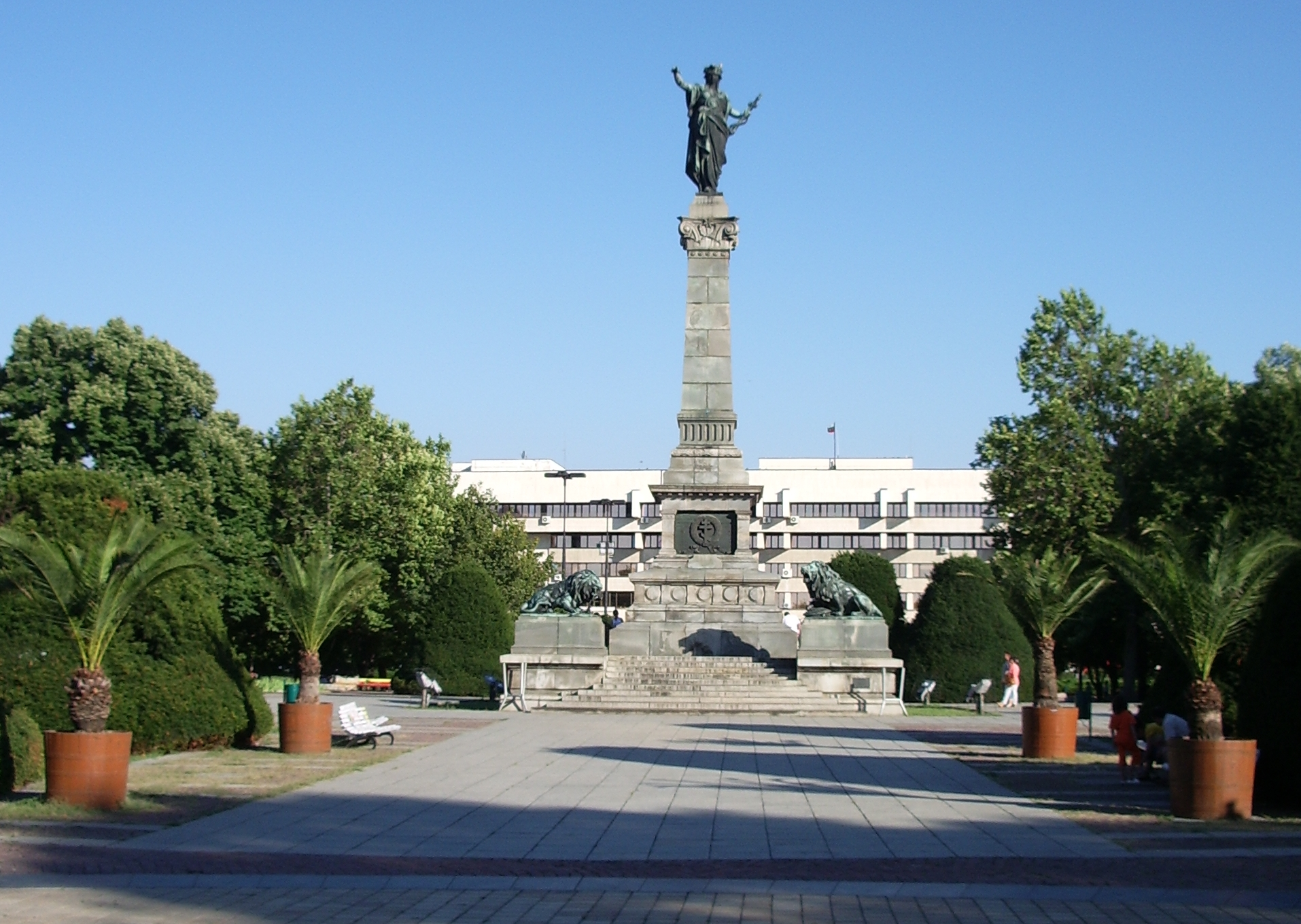
A distant view

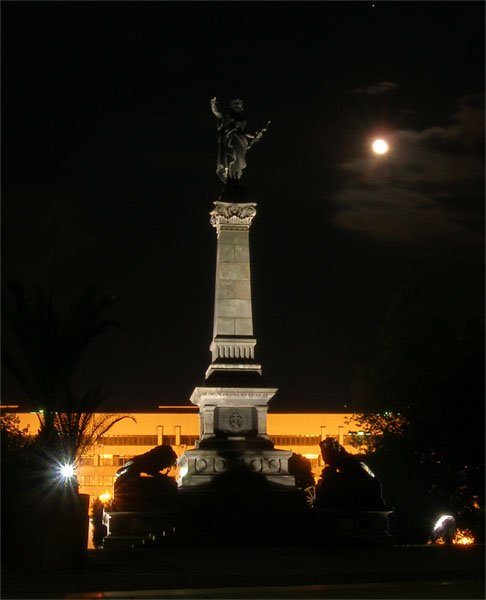
At night

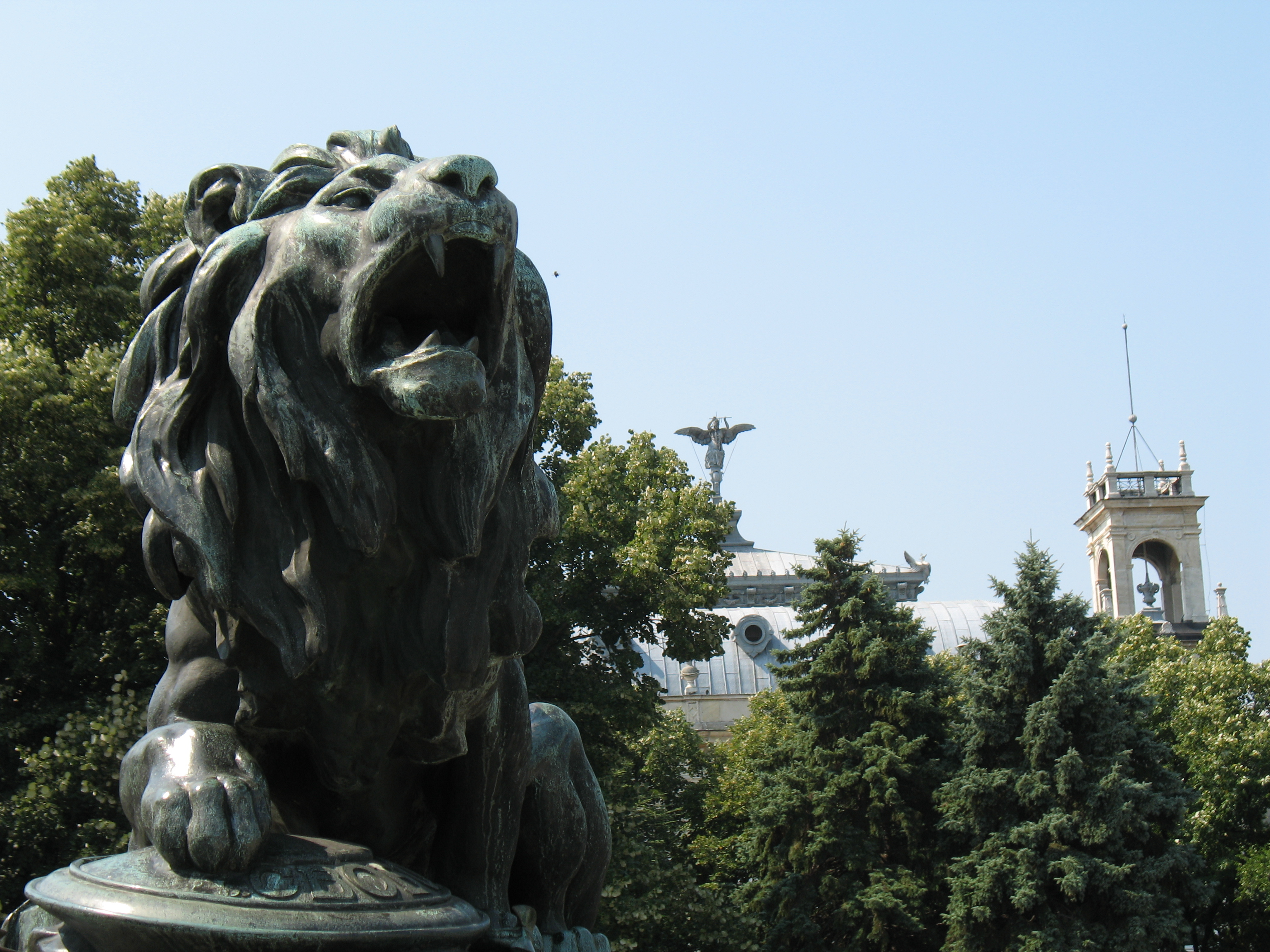
Lion

Cannon

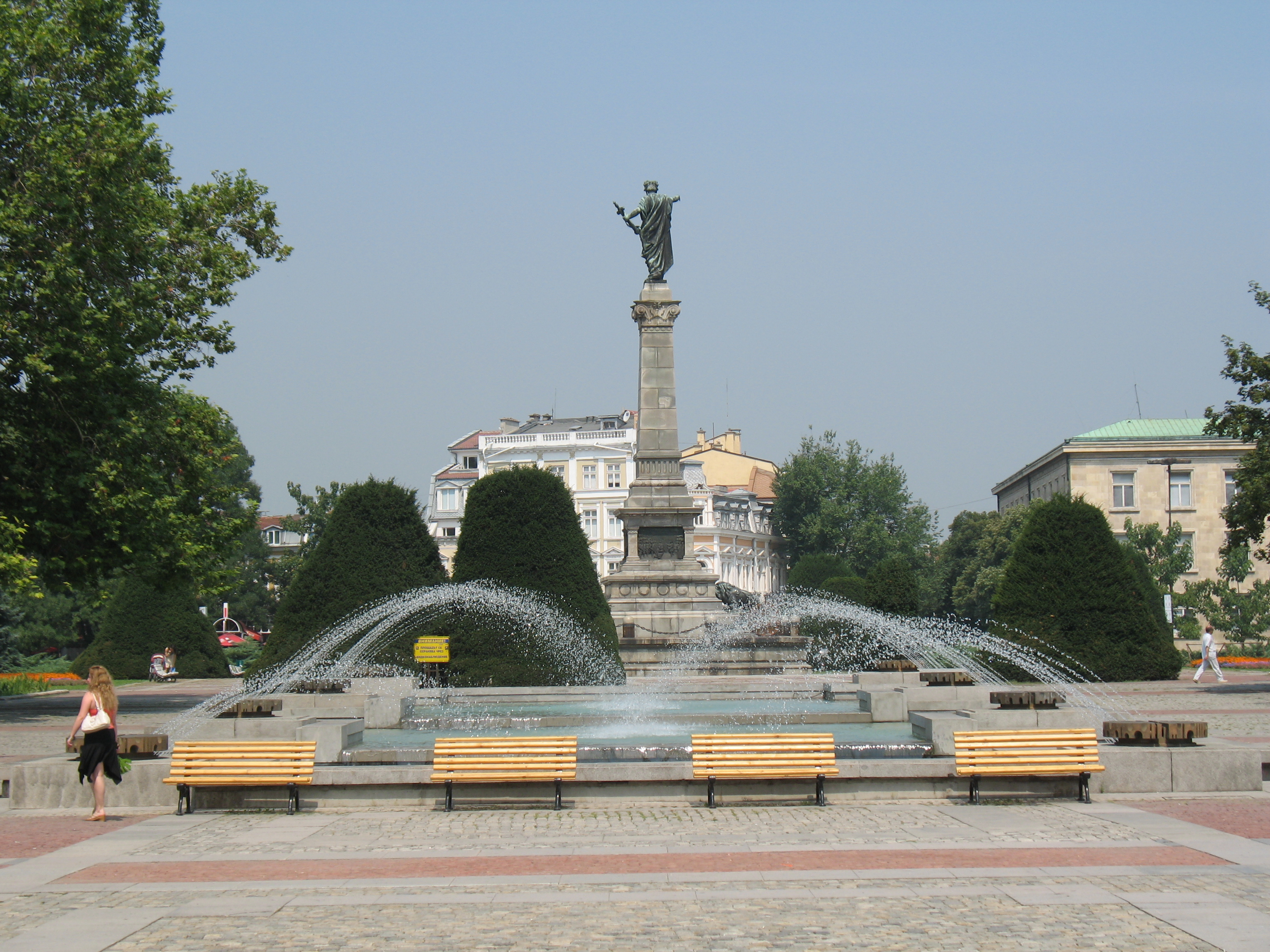

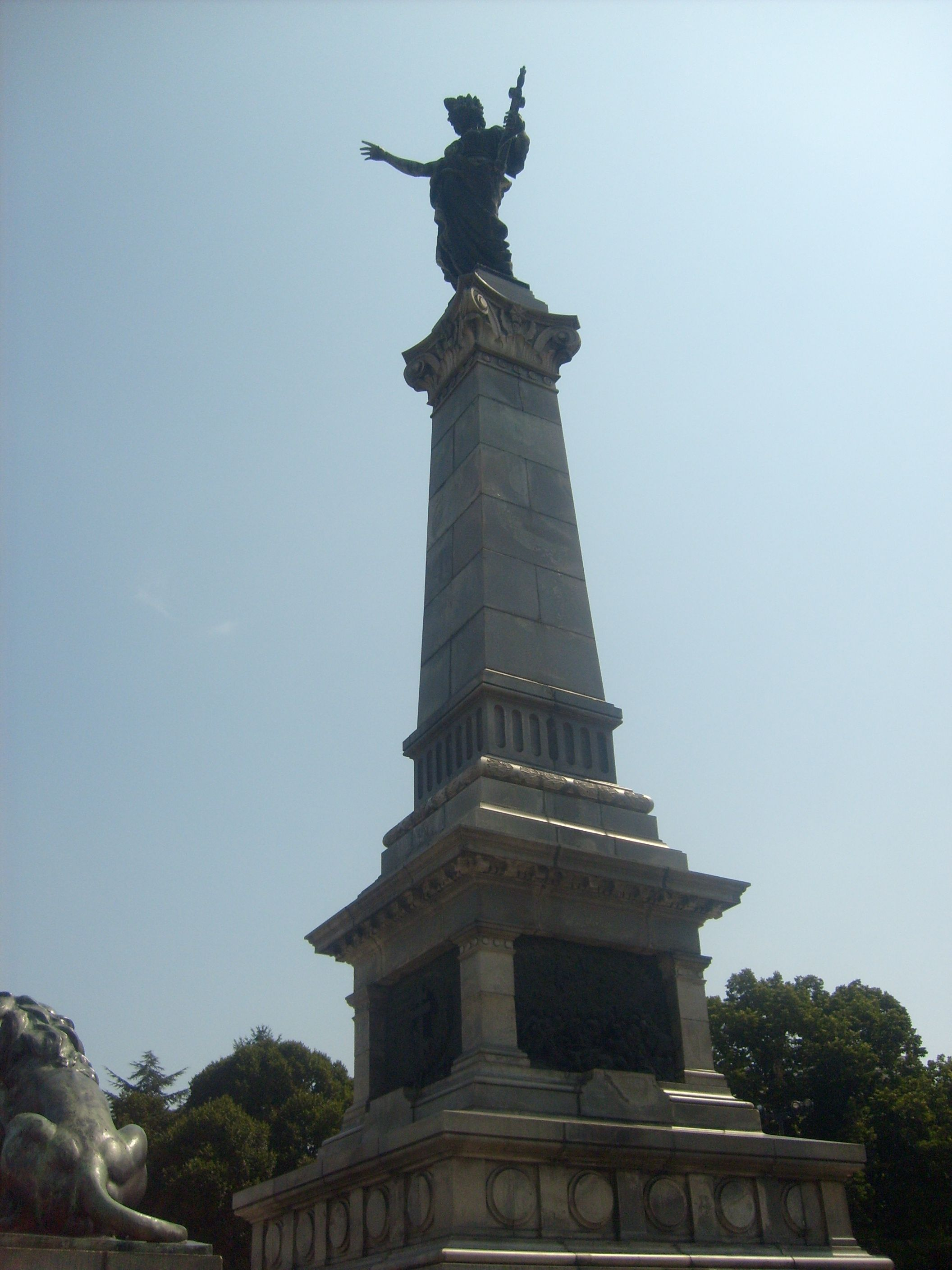

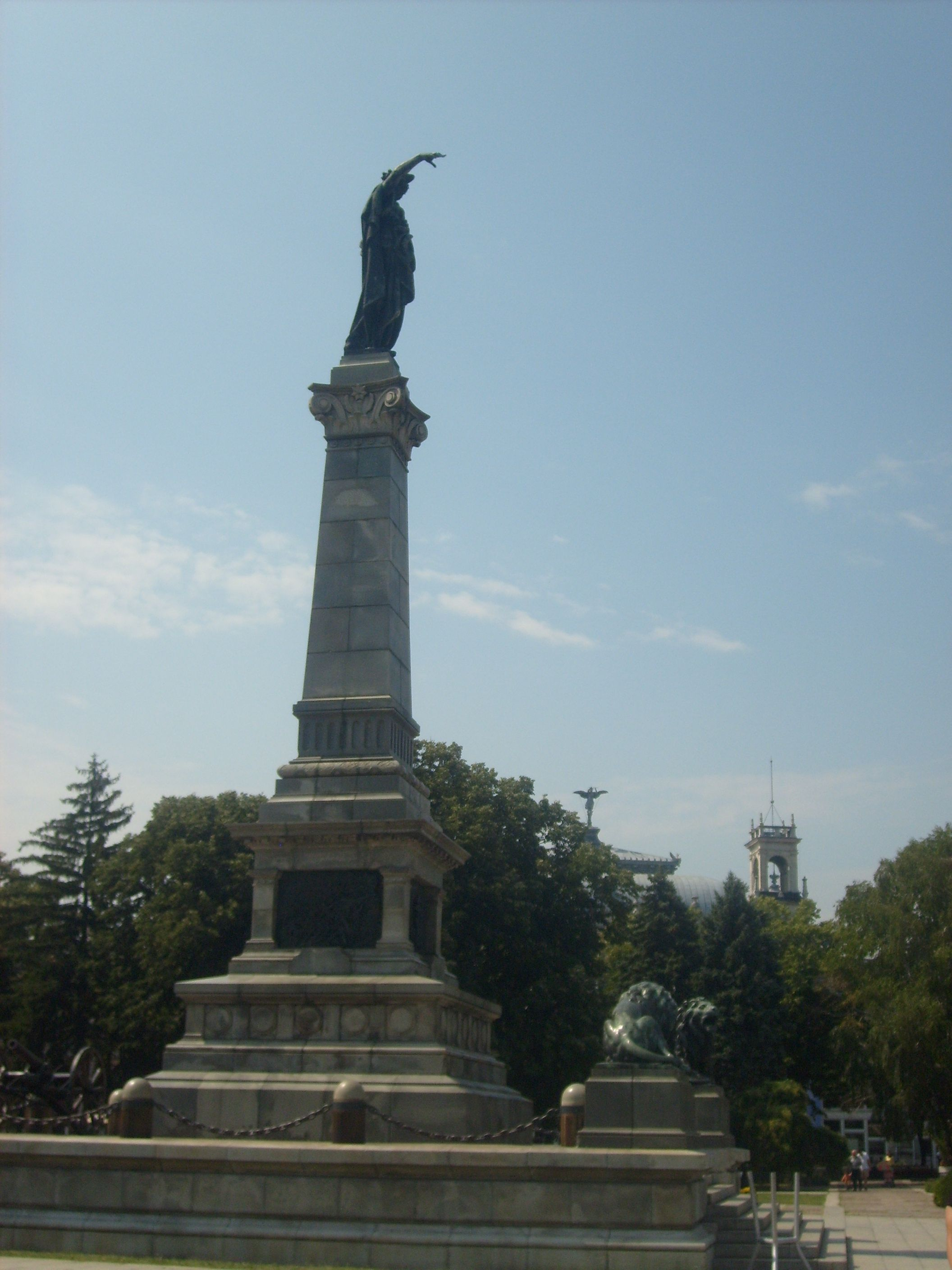
