= Zocchi =

Zocchi is an Italian surname. Notable people with the surname include:

- Arnoldo Zocchi (also Arnaldo) (1862–1940), Italian sculptor
- Emilio Zocchi (1835–1913), Italian sculptor
- Giuseppe Zocchi (c. 1711–1767), Italian painter and printmaker
- Lou Zocchi (1935–2026), American gaming hobbyist, game distributor and publisher
- Nietta Zocchi (1909–1981), Italian film actress
