= Pasquale Romanelli =

Italian sculptor (1812–1887)

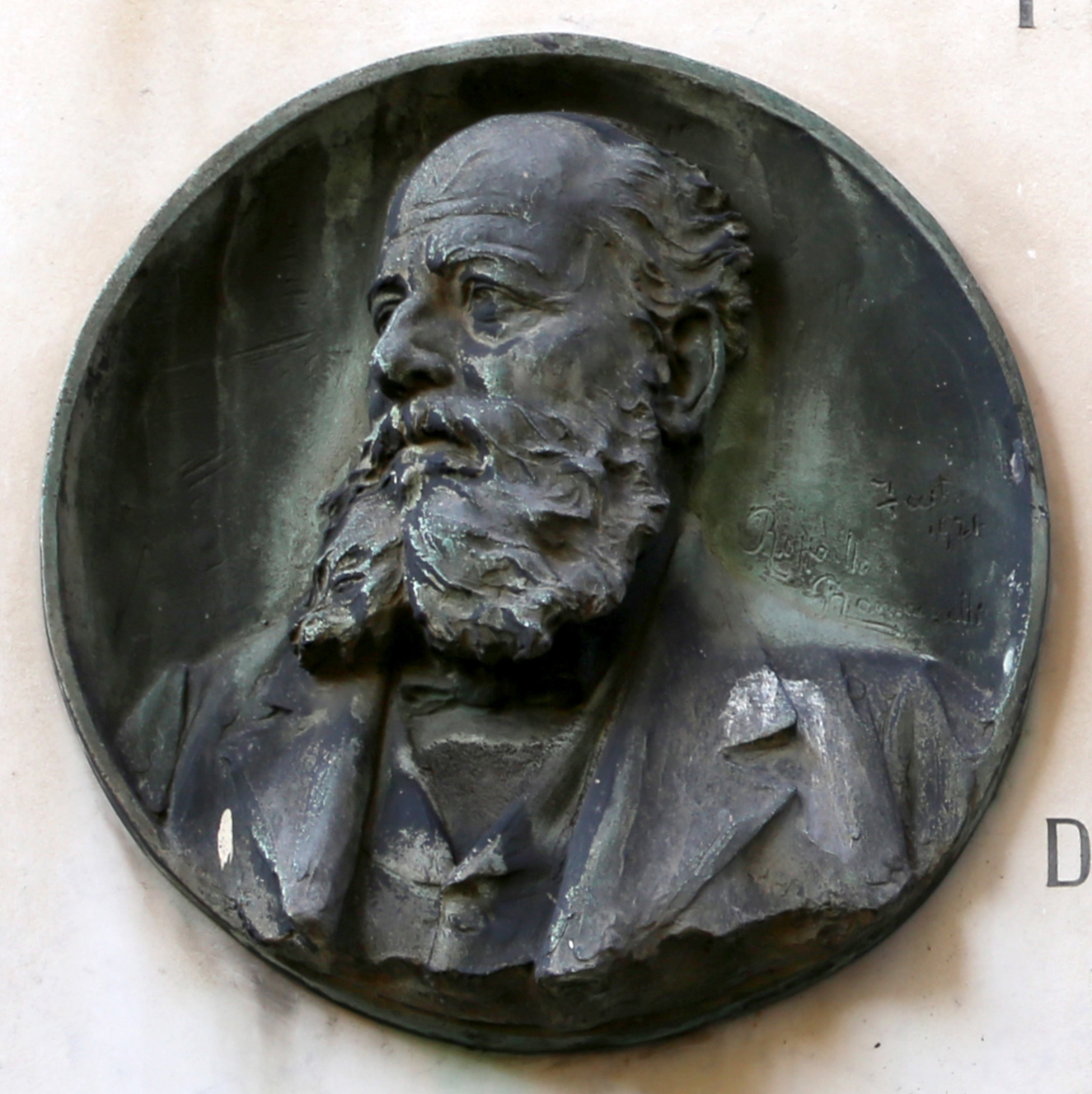
Raffaello Romanelli, plaque to Pasquale Romanelli, 1921, 02.jpg

Pasquale Romanelli (28 May 1812 – 11 February 1887) was an Italian sculptor, and apprentice of Lorenzo Bartolini.

== Personal life ==
Born in Florence in 1812 to Luigi Romanelli and Beatrice Chelazzi. At a young age he was orphaned by his mother. Pasquale married Elisa Mangoni, and together they had 6 children. His son Raffaello Romanelli and grand-son Romano Romanelli were also sculptors.

== Career ==
Pasquale entered an apprenticeship in a studio producing alabaster sculptures, studying in his free time. Alabaster, or Castellina marble, is softer to carve than usual marble and, thus, often used by those in training. When he was barely fifteen years old, he became an apprentice in the studio of Luigi Pampaloni, in Piazza San Marco, who trained him sculpting Carrara statuary marble. He was quickly promoted to assisting the master in the carving of the statues of Arnolfo di Cambio and Filippo Brunelleschi, now placed in the Piazza del Duomo in Florence.

Pasquale then was invited to work in the studio of Lorenzo Bartolini, professor of sculpture at the Accademia di Belle Arti di Firenze, and to attend his courses at the academy. He became Bartolini’s most gifted pupil and certain commissions were passed-on to him. Pasquale worked on the statue of Francesco Ferrucci (1847), which was then placed in an alcove of the loggiato of the Uffizi Gallery in Piazza della Signoria. He soon opened a studio of his own.

== First exhibition ==
In 1840 Pasquale exhibited his first personal work entitled The Son of William Tell. The sculpture alluded to the popular desire for Italian independence. It met with such success that it was subsequently given a prize at the New York Exhibition of 1854 and also at the 1861 first Great Italian exhibition which followed the Unification of Italy in 1860. The statue was bought by Italian king S.M. Vittorio Emanuele II.

== As patriot ==
A young Pasquale joined the revolutionary groups Giovine Italia who urged independence from the Austrians. He enrolled in the volunteer army of 1848, but by 1849 he was forced to go into hiding in the wild countryside of Maremma. It was not until calm reigned again in 1850 that he was able to return to Florence to continue with sculpting.

== Bartolini's legacy ==
In that same year Lorenzo Bartolini died, Pasquale acquired the studio in Borgo San Frediano and he was entrusted with completing several of Bartolini’s great monuments that were unfinished at the time of his death. The first was to transform the plaster of Fiducia in Dio into marble, which now resides in the Hermitage Museum in St Petersburg.

Pasquale created the portrait bust for a funeral monument of Bartolini in the Basilica of Santa Croce in 1858. He had already made several marble portraits of his master during his time as his pupil, one of which was exhibited in the Poldi-Pezzoli Museum in Milan and another in the Palazzo Pitti, in Florence and in the Florence’s Gallery of Modern Art in 1845. It is thought that he continued to transform Bartolini’s plaster models into marble up until the 70s. The most important commission that Romanelli won was to complete Bartolini’s design for the immense monument to Prince Nicolai Demidoff, a complex work with many figures beside the Prince. It was unveiled at the end of the year 1871.

== Later years ==
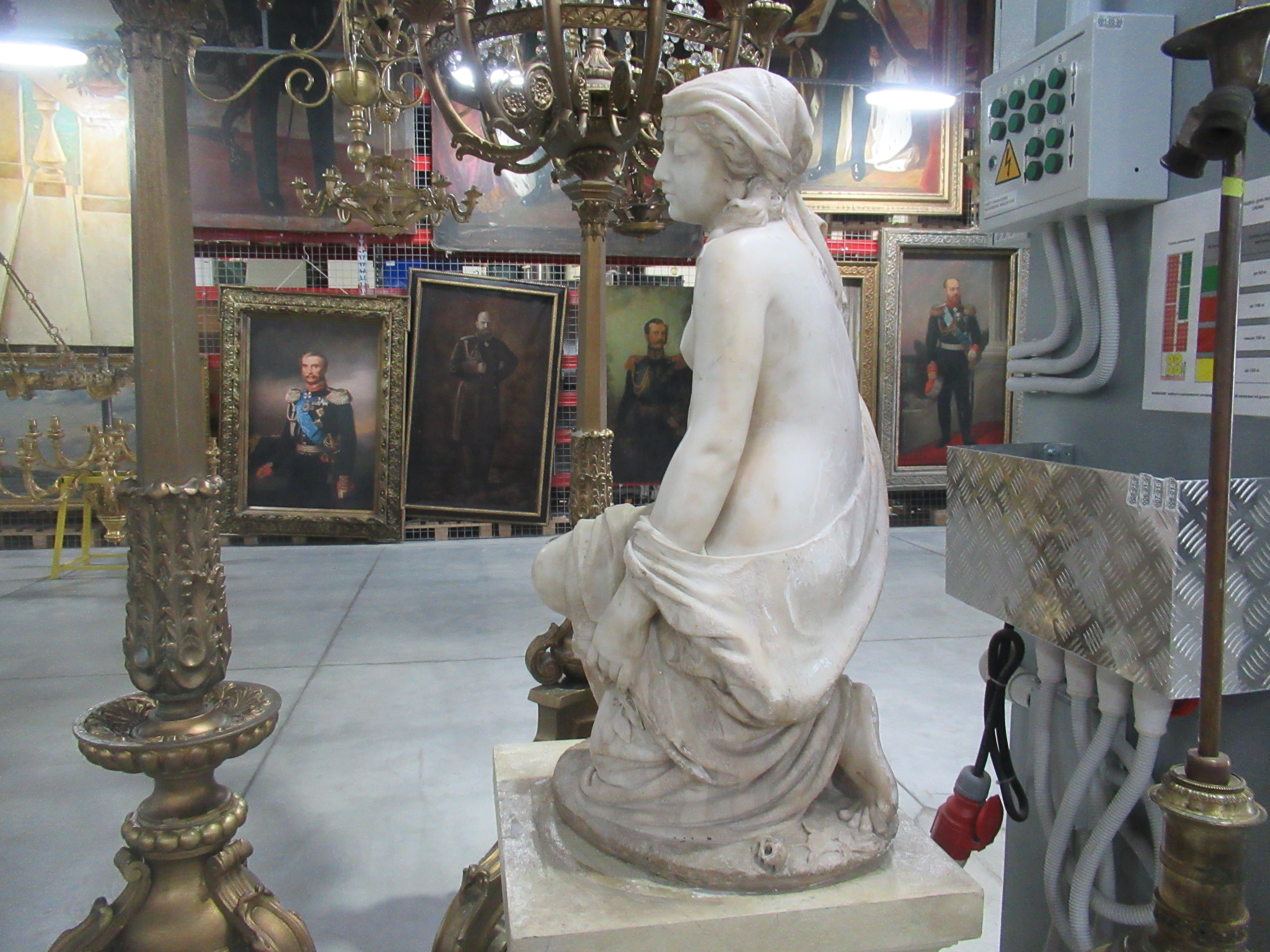
Odalisque at "Mosfilm"

In the meantime Pasquale also focused on his own works, creating The Genius of Italy (1853) and Italy Deluded, both exhibited in Paris in 1855, but the pre-unification mood of Italy had made them too politically sensitive to exhibit them until 1859. In fact the Genius of Italy arrived in Paris with its legs broken. The statue had been vandalized by Pasquale’s enemies and Pasquale subsequently refused to sell it at any price so it remains in the possession of his descendants at the Galleria Romanelli to this day. In 1861 Pasquale completed a sculptural group the Sons of Mrs Whyte as well as the Nymph of the Arno.

After Italian unification in 1861, Florence briefly became the capital and commissions increased. Pasquale received numerous commissions from America and from England. He opened an art gallery on the Lungarno Acciaiuoli where completed works could be sold directly to the public. In 1863, he made the monument dedicated to Fossombroni at Arezzo, and in 1864 the monument dedicated to Count Alessandro Masi for the Certosa of Ferrara. In 1868 he was appointed professor of sculpture at the Academy of Fine Arts, Florence.

Among his works were The Boy Washington, bought by Prince Amedeo of Savoy, and portraits of king Vittorio Emanuele II, of Prince Albert, the consort of Queen Victoria. He also made two portraits of Bartolini on show at the Galleria Romanelli, one of which was made for the monument erected on Bartolini's tomb in the Church of Santa Croce.

His «Odalisque (Sulamitide)» became a legendary movie prop in Soviet movies (see ru:Прасковья Тулупова).

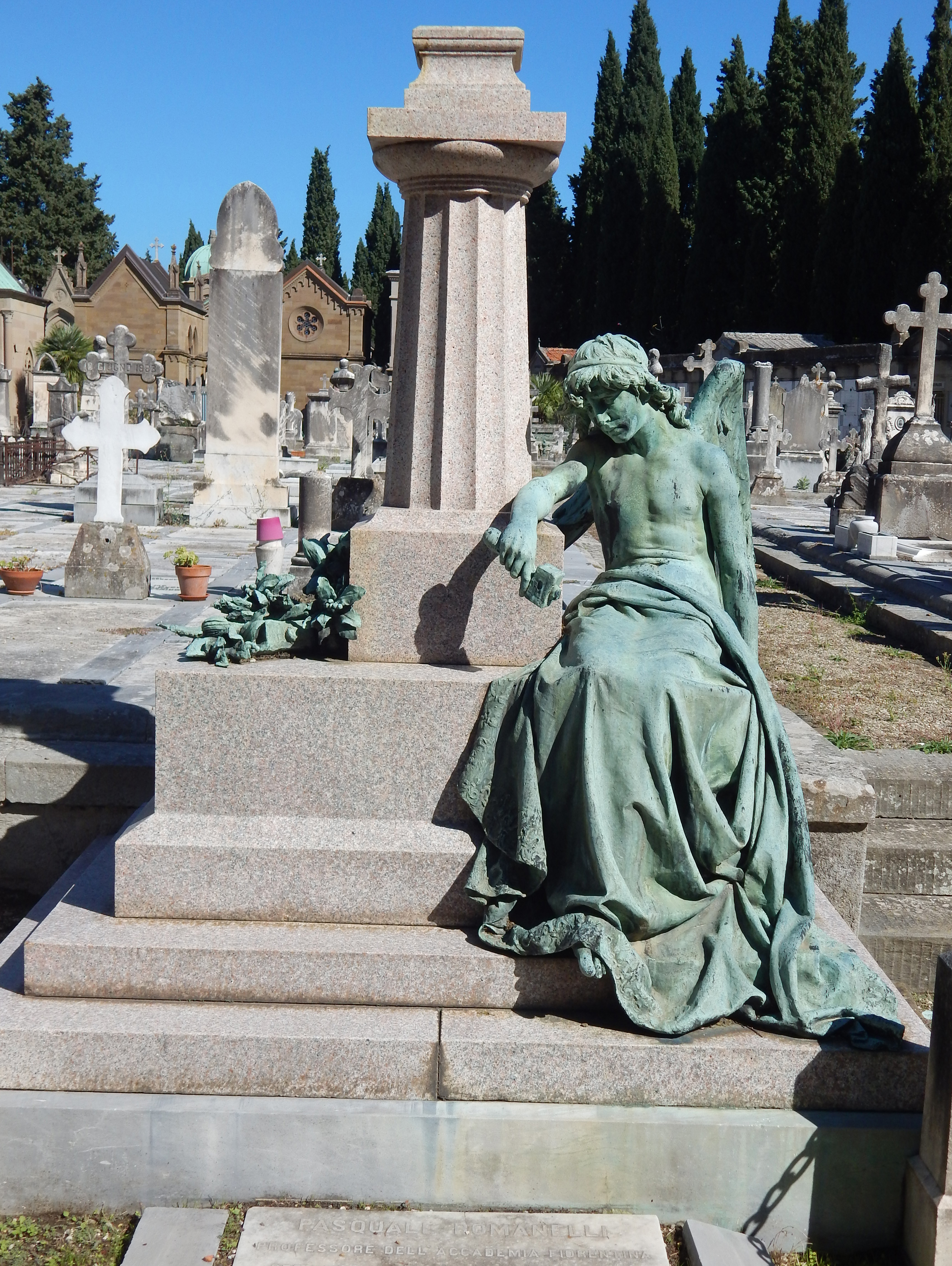
Pasquale Romanelli grave in Porte Sante Cemetery, Florence

Pasquale Romanelli is buried in Cimitero delle Porte Sante in Florence. His grave is marked with a bronze sculpture (1887) by his son, Raffaelo.
