= Equestrian statue of Charles Albert of Sardinia =

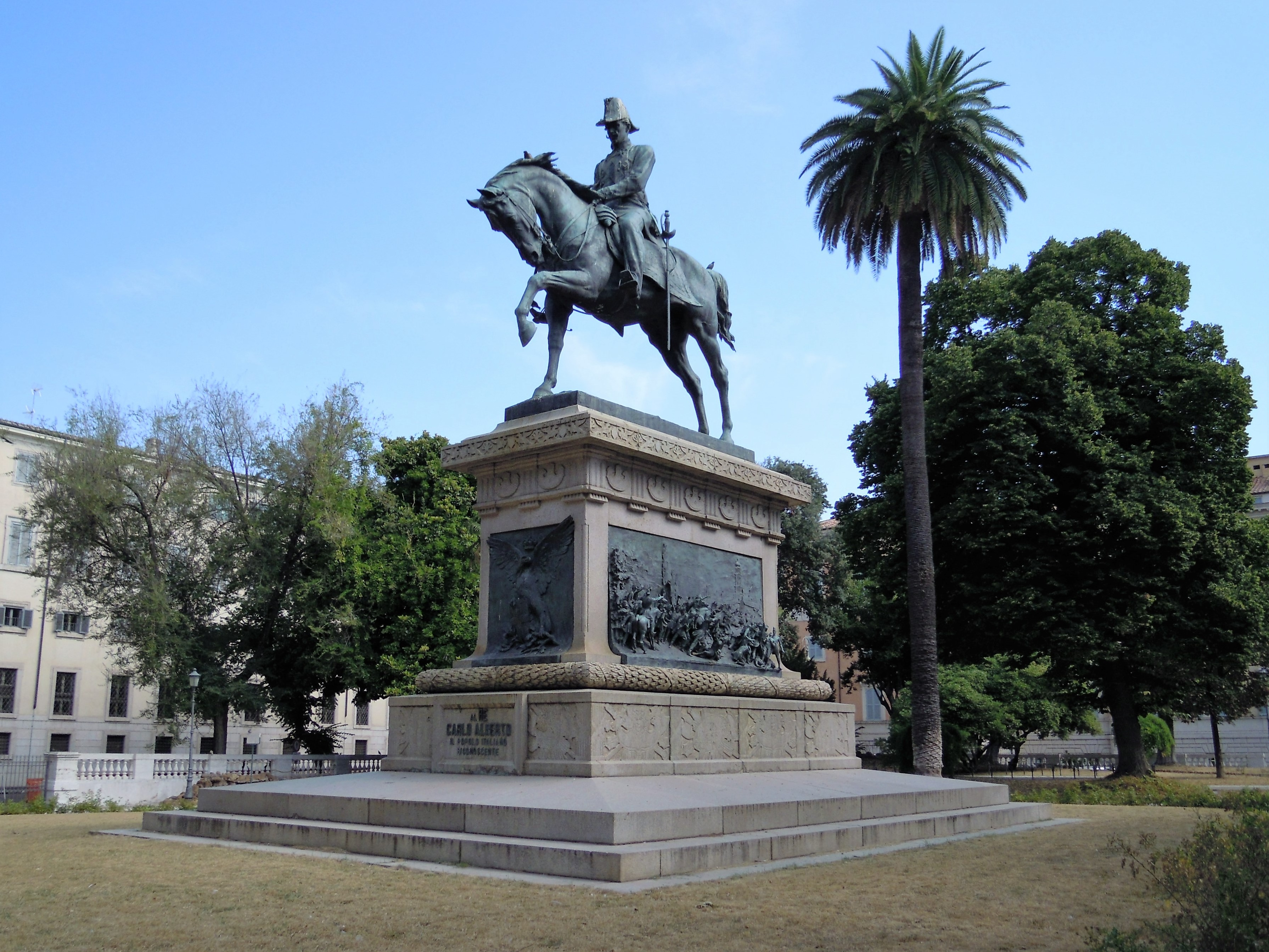
- The statue in 2016
- Location: Rome, Italy

An equestrian statue of Charles Albert of Sardinia by Italian artist Raffaello Romanelli is installed in Rome, Italy.

== See also ==
- List of equestrian statues in Italy
