= Arnaldo Zocchi =

Italian sculptor

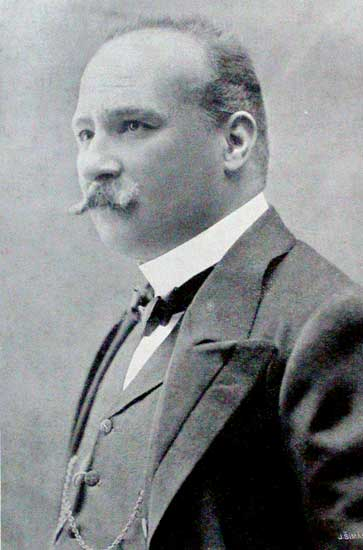
Arnaldo Zocchi

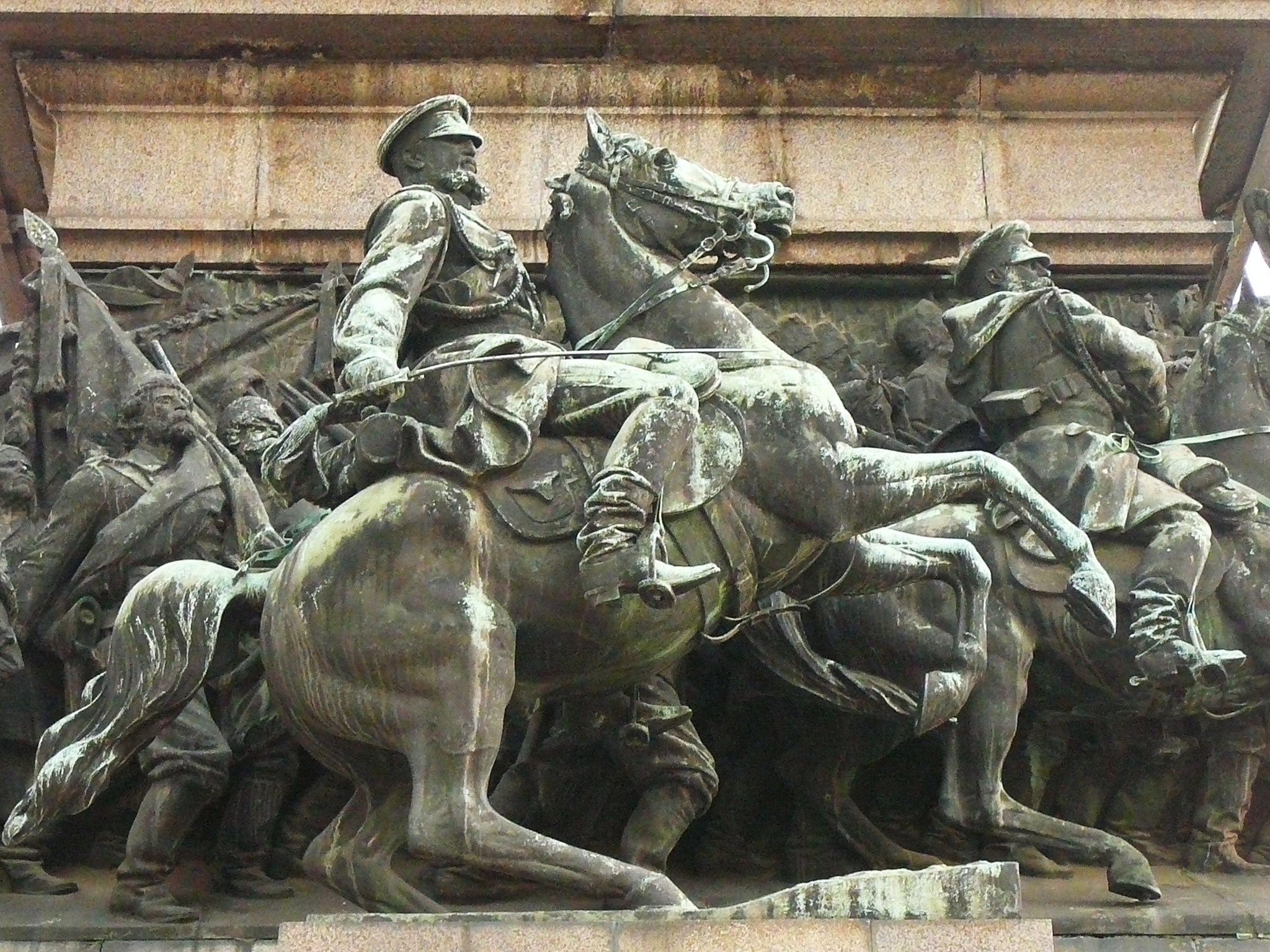
Monument to the Tsar Liberator in Sofia, Bulgaria, 1907

Arnaldo Zocchi (20 September 1862 – 17 July 1940) was an Italian sculptor of the late 19th and early 20th century. He was born in Florence and died in Rome. He studied sculpture in Florence under his father Emilio Zocchi.

== Works ==
=== Italy ===
- Four Winged Victories at the Monument of Vittorio Emanuele II n Rome (co-work with three other sculptors)
- Monument to Garibaldi in Bologna (1901)
- Monument to Michelangelo in Caprese Michelangelo (1911)
- Monument to the Martyrs of the Altamuran Revolution
- Monument to the Fallen in World War I, (piazza Zanardelli, Altamura)
- Monument to the Fallen in Sarteano
- Monument to the Fallen in World War I in Nomentano, Rome (1938)
- Monument to Manuel Belgrano in Genoa (1927)
- Monument to Piero della Francesca in Sansepolcro (1892)
- Monument to Christopher Columbus in Lavagna (1930)

=== Bulgaria ===
- Demeter Fountain in Plovdiv (1891),
- Monument of Liberty in Rousse (1900s)
- Monument to the Tsar Liberator in Sofia (1907)
- Various works in Sevlievo (1894), Lovech, Oryahovo (1903), the Dryanovo Monastery and Vidin (1911)

=== Rest of world ===
- Monument to Christopher Columbus in Buenos Aires, Argentina (1921)
- Monument to Saint Francis of Assisi in Cairo, Egypt
- Monument to General Lafayette in Haverhill, Massachusetts, USA

== Gallery ==
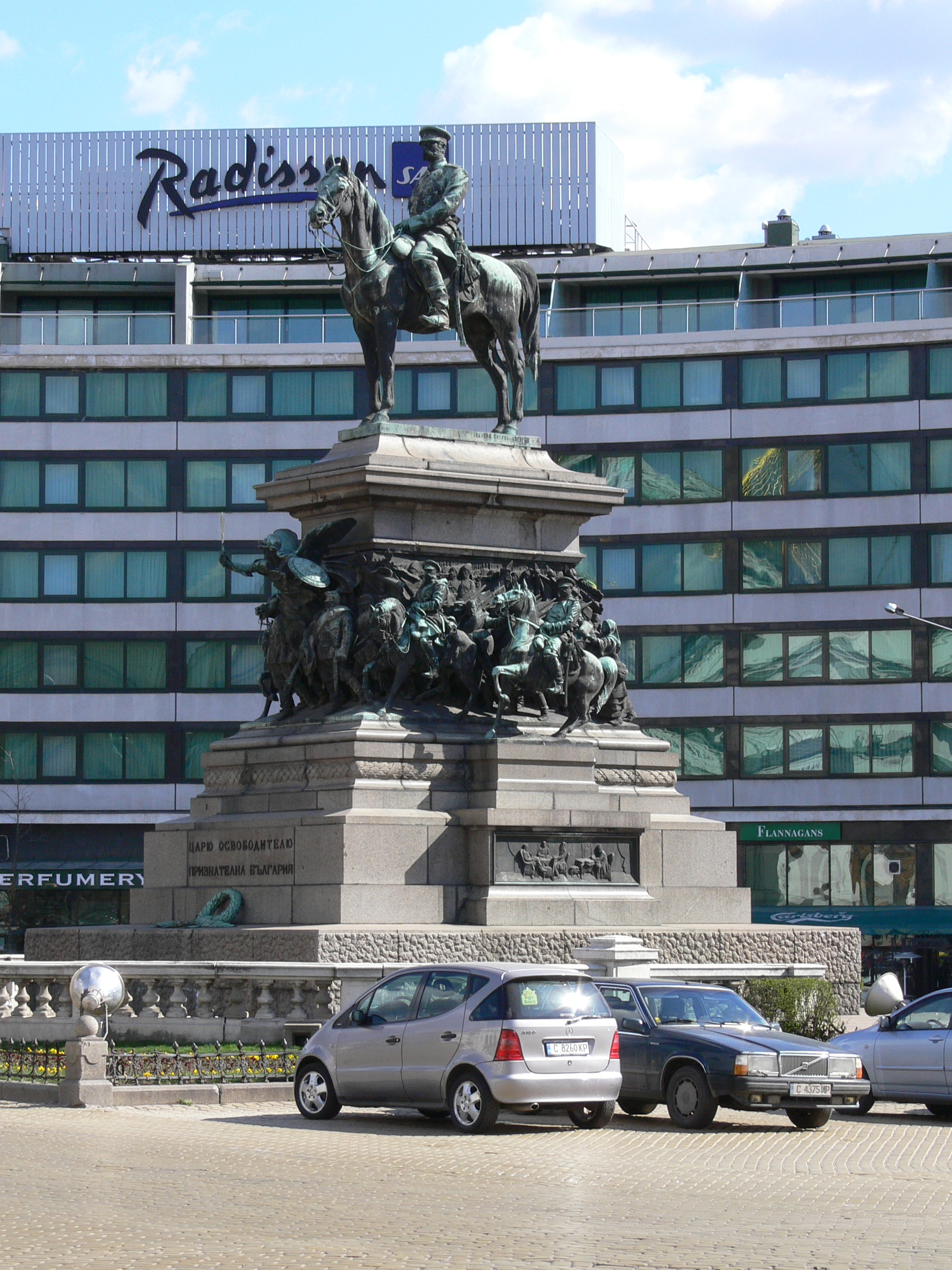
Monument to the Tsar Liberator, Sofia

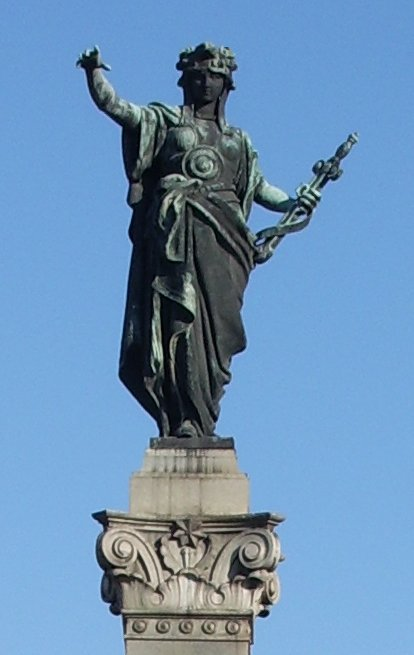
Monument of Liberty, Rousse

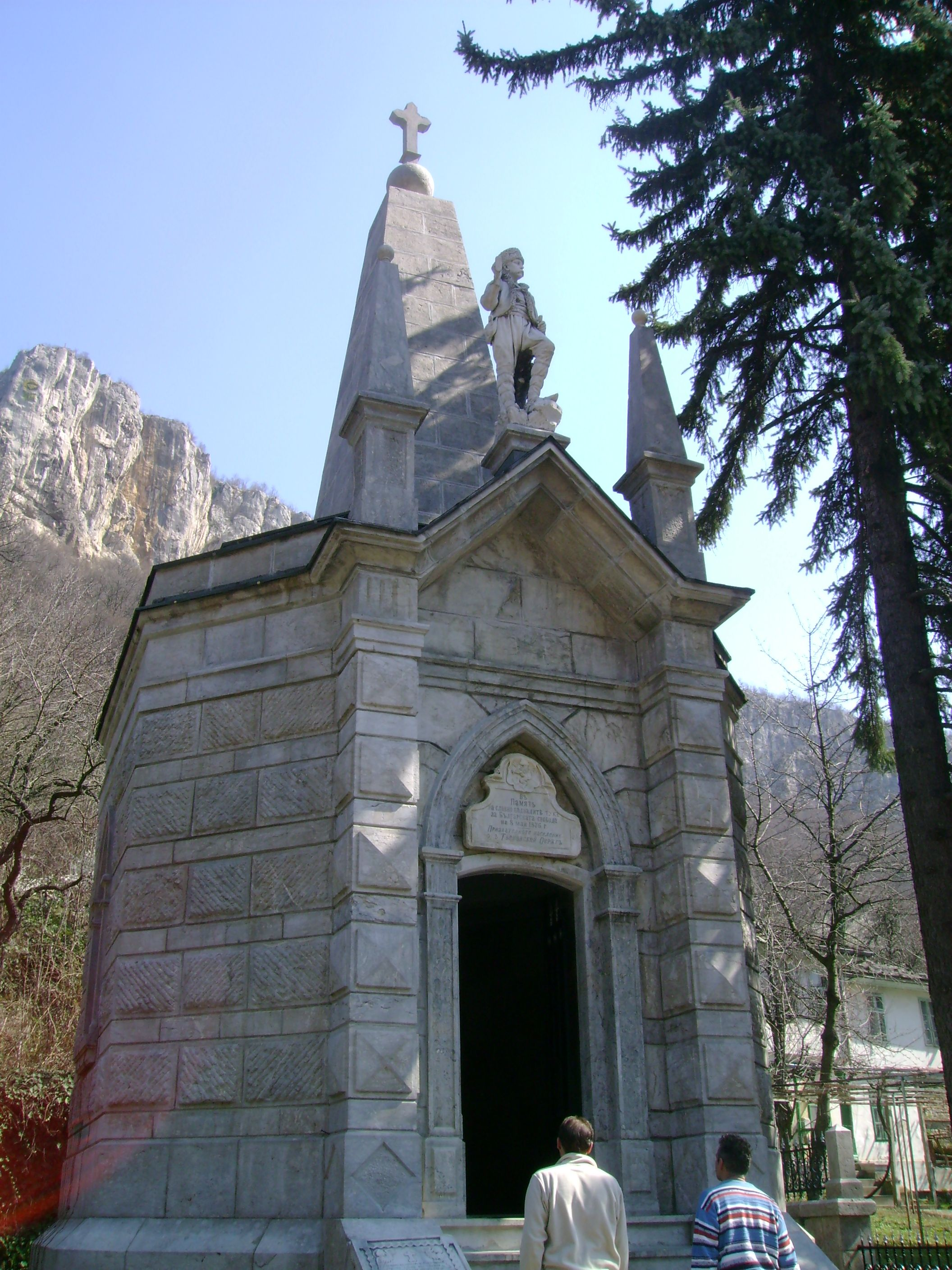
Monument to the Fallen for the Liberation of Bulgaria in the Dryanovo Monastery

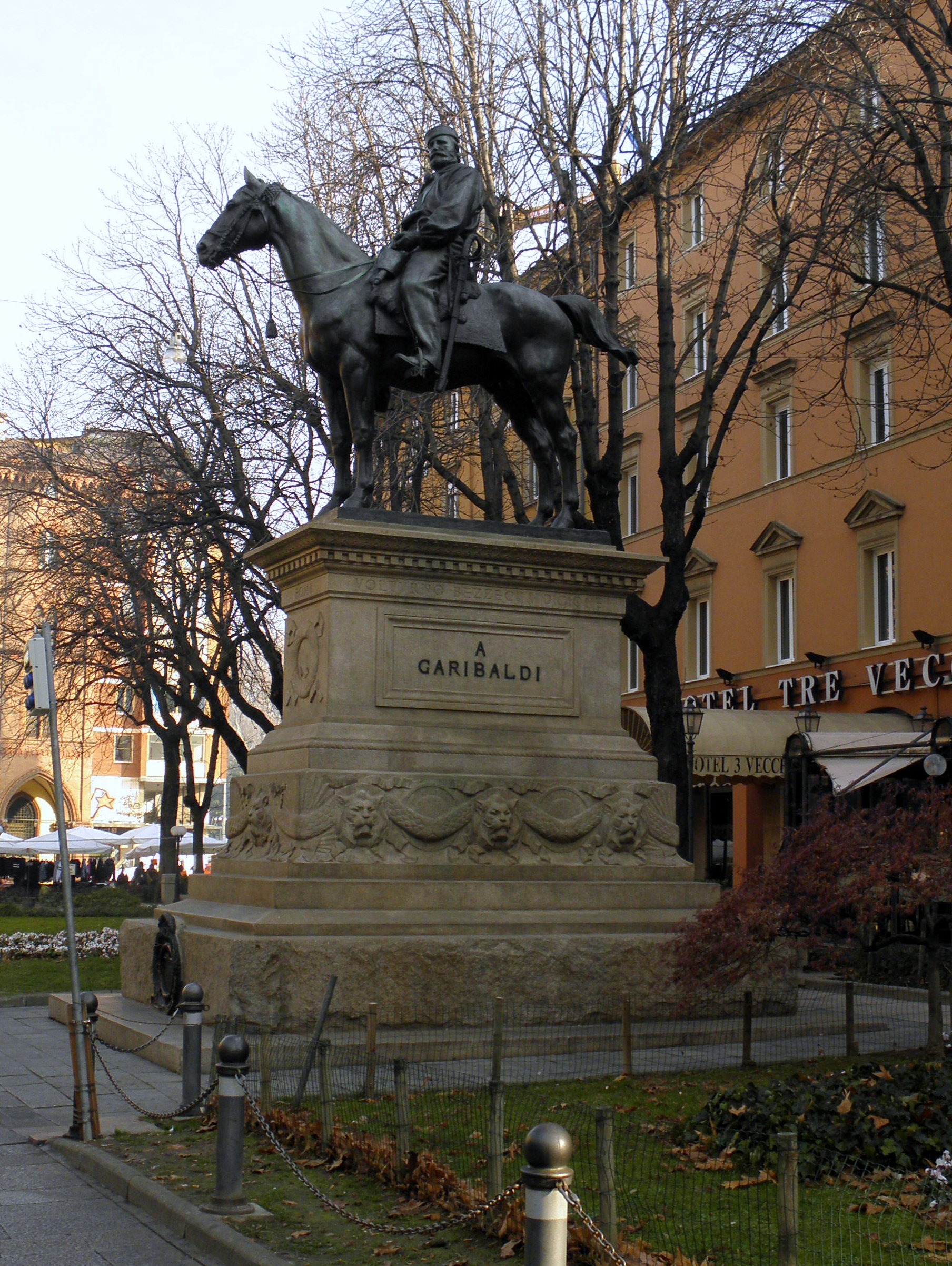
Monument to Giuseppe Garibaldi (1901, Bologna)

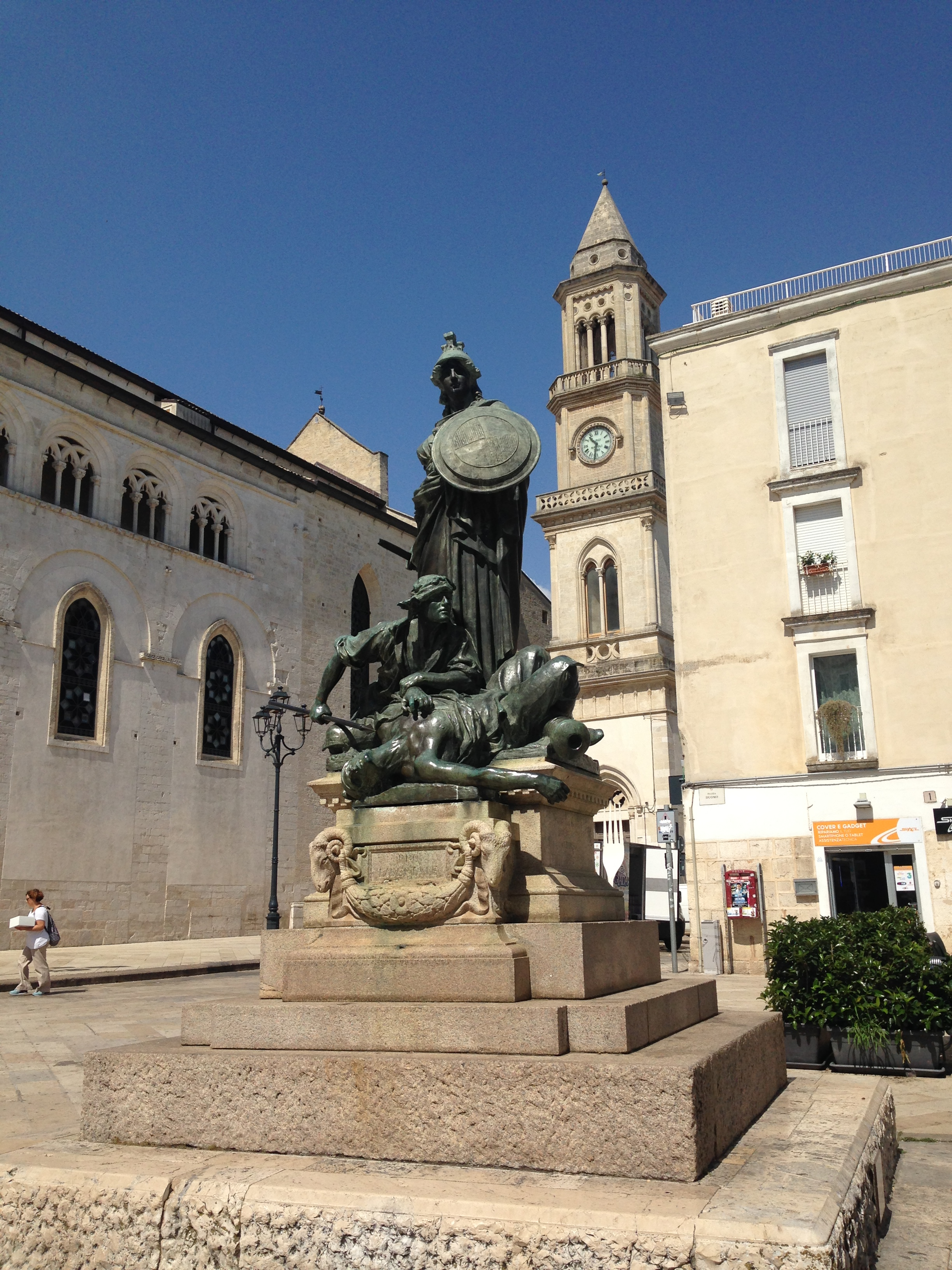
Monument to the Martyrs of the Altamuran Revolution (1899, Altamura)

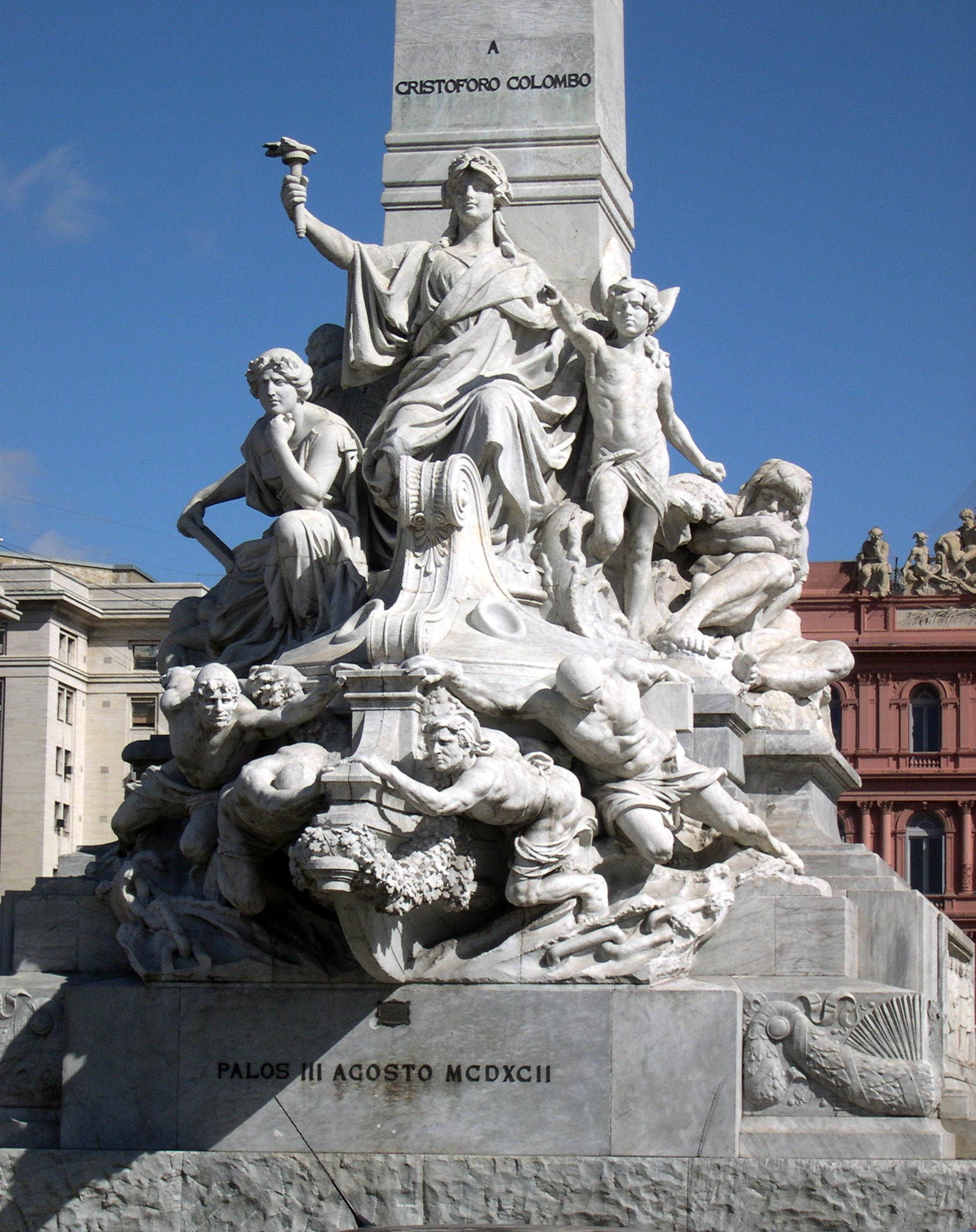
Monument to Christopher Columbus, Buenos Aires, Argentina
