= Monument to the Tsar Liberator =

1903 statue of Alexander II in Sofia, Bulgaria

Coordinates: 42°41′38″N 23°19′57″E

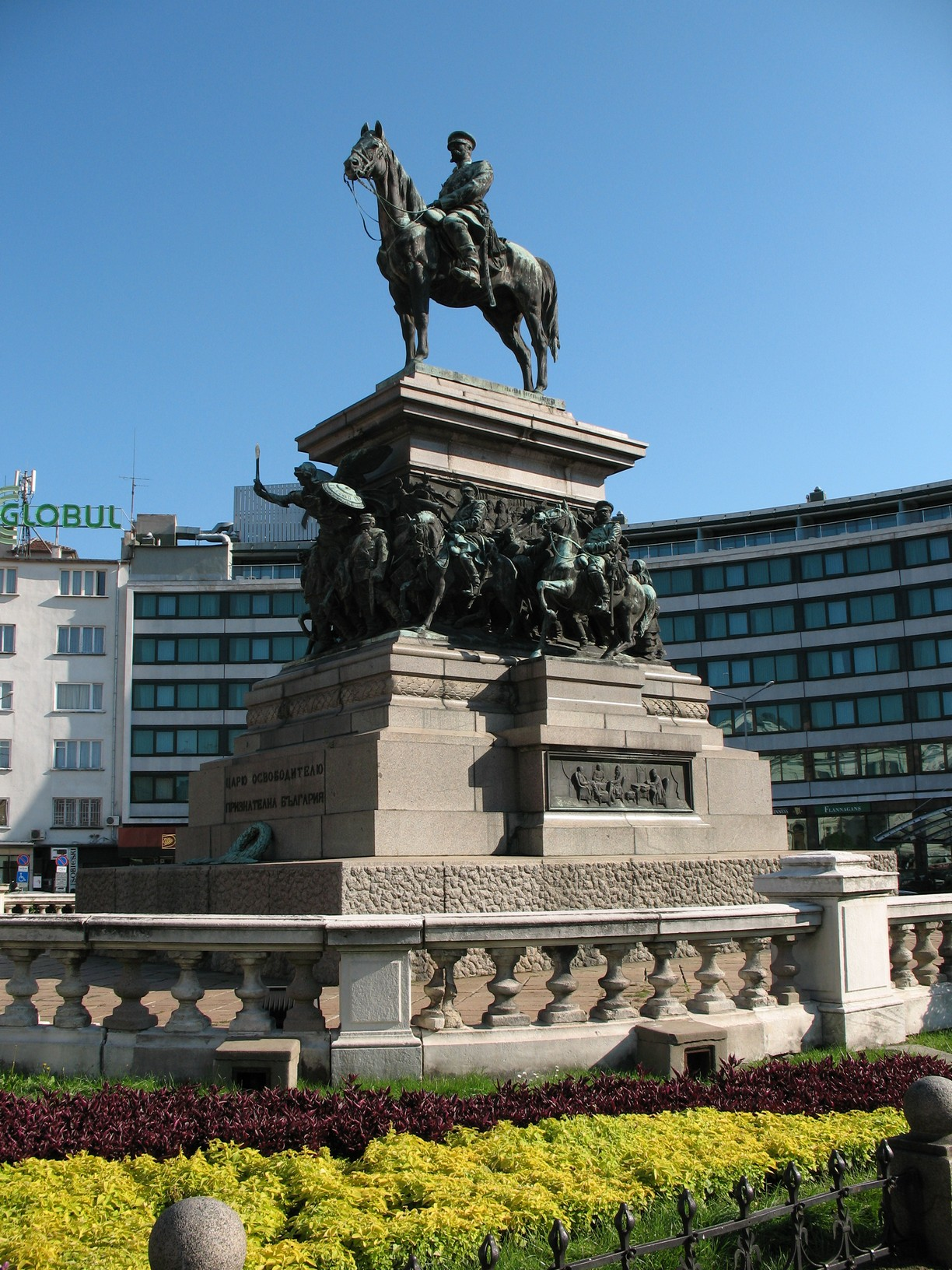
The Monument to the Tsar Liberator

The Monument to the Tsar Liberator (Bulgarian: Паметник на Цар Освободител, romanized: Pametnik na Tsar Osvoboditel) is an equestrian monument in the centre of Sofia, the capital of Bulgaria. It was created in honour of Russian Emperor Alexander II, who liberated the serfs in Russia and won the Russo-Turkish War of 1877–78.

The Neoclassical memorial's author is Italian sculptor Arnoldo Zocchi, who won the project in competition with 31 other artists from 12 countries (and with a total of 90 artists from 15 countries being interested) in the end of the 19th century. Bulgarian architect Nikola Lazarov participated in the monument's architectural design. The foundation stone was laid on 23 April 1901, St George's Day, in the presence of Knyaz Ferdinand I of Bulgaria, and the monument was completed on 15 September 1903.

Ferdinand also attended the monument's inauguration on 30 August 1907 together with his sons Boris and Kiril, Grand Duke Vladimir Alexandrovich of Russia, son of Alexander II, together with his wife and his son, as well as other notable figures.

Erected of black polished granite from Vitosha, the Monument to the Tsar Liberator consists of a pedestal, a middle part with figures and a massive Neo-Renaissance cornice finished with the sculpture of the Russian Tsar on a horse. The bronze wreath at the foot was donated by Romania in memory of the Romanian soldiers that died during the war.

The main bronze bas-relief in the middle part depicts a group of Russian and Bulgarian soldiers led by the goddess of victory (Nike in Greek mythology and Victoria in Roman mythology), who raises her sword high above. Portraits of Grand Duke Nicholas Nicolaievich, Count Ignatiev and the generals Joseph Vladimirovich Gourko and Mikhail Skobelev surround the group. Other bas-reliefs feature scenes from the Battle of Stara Zagora, the signing of the Treaty of San Stefano and the opening ceremony of the Constituent National Assembly in Veliko Tarnovo, as well as portraits of Petko Slaveykov, Stoyan Zaimov, Ivan Vazov, Stefan Stambolov and other prominent figures from the period.

The Monument to the Tsar Liberator is on Tsar Osvoboditel Boulevard, facing the National Assembly of Bulgaria and with the InterContinental hotel behind it.

== Gallery ==
Gallery

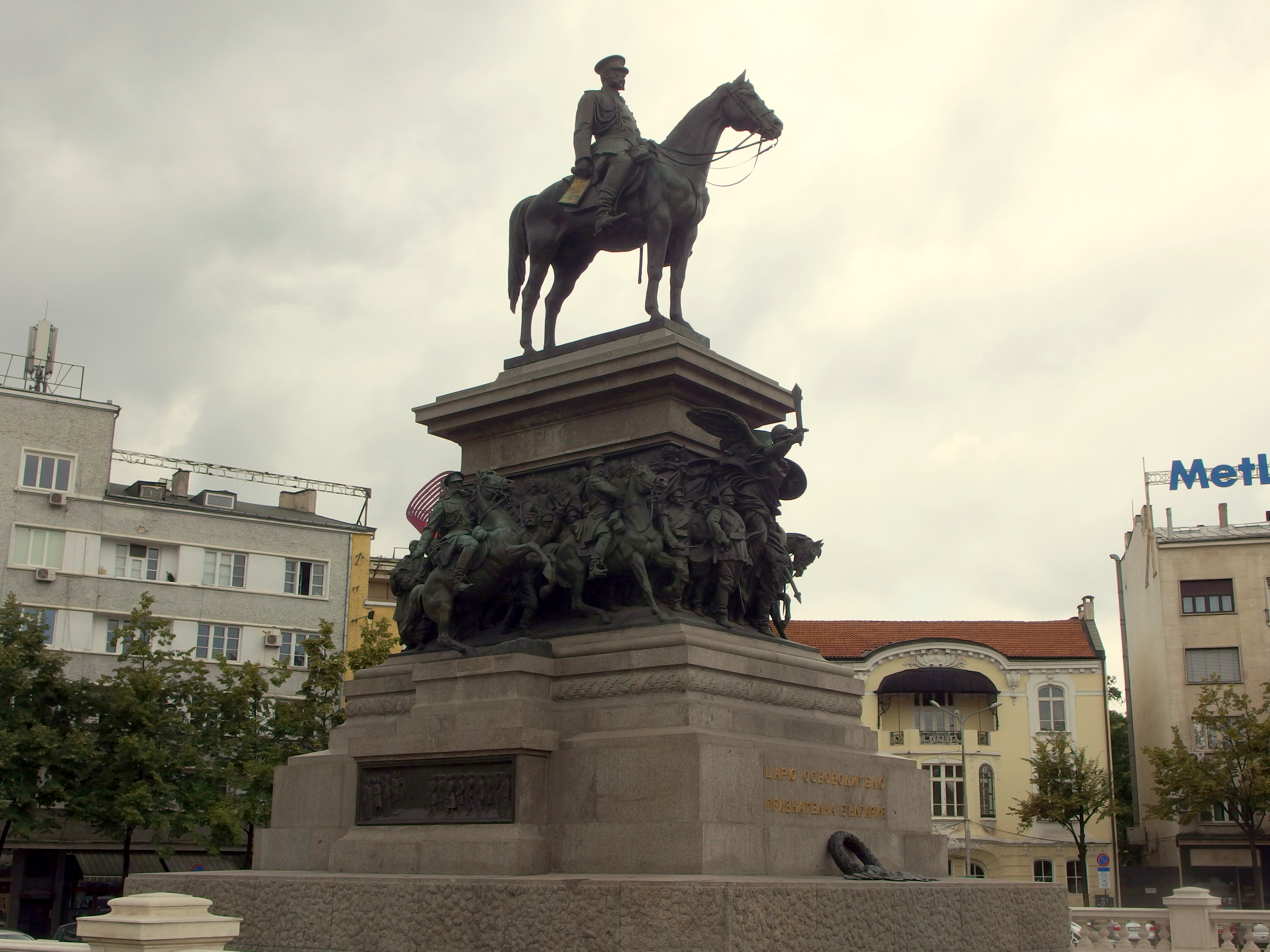

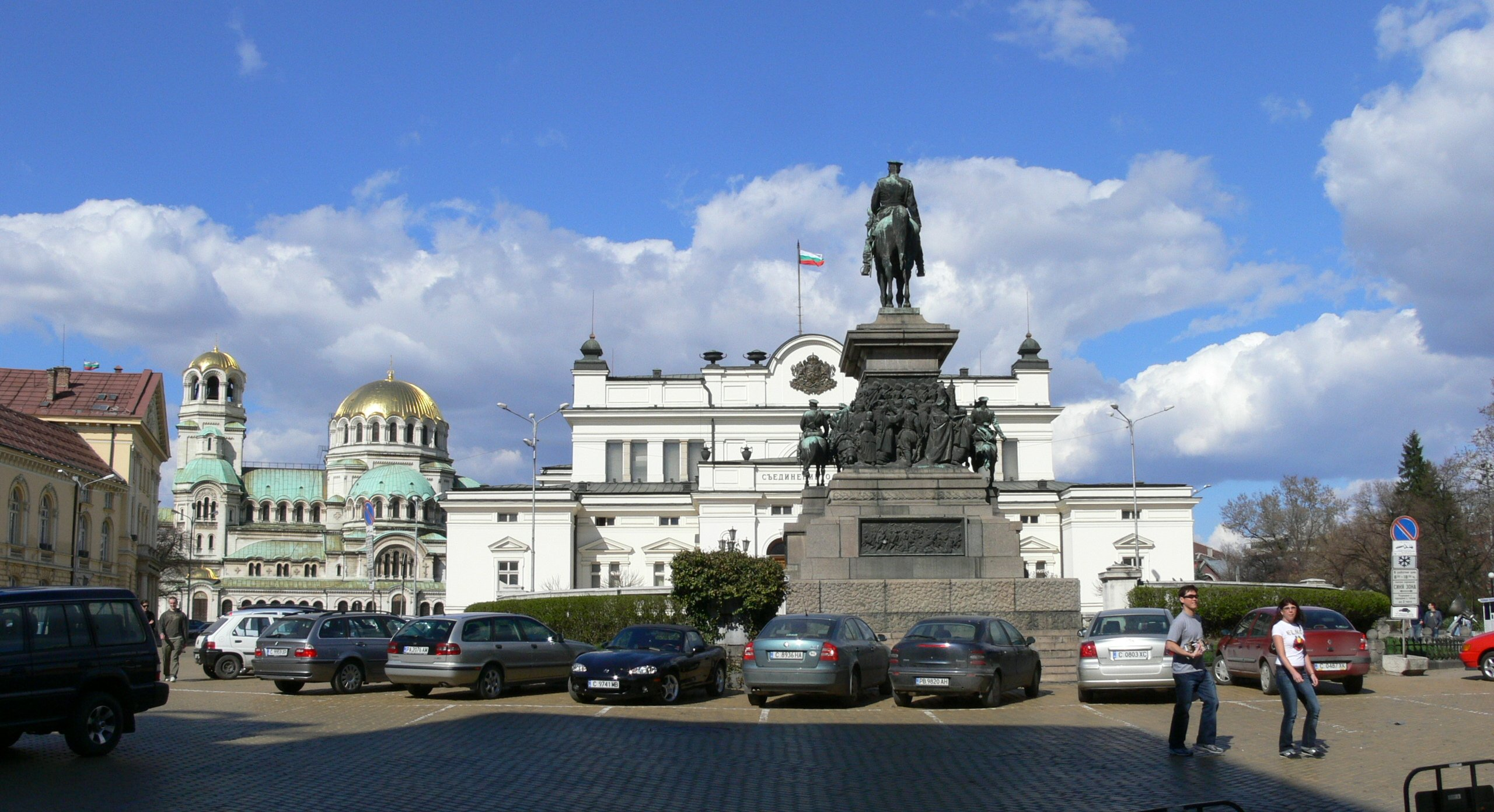
Rear view with the National Assembly of Bulgaria and the Alexander Nevsky Cathedral

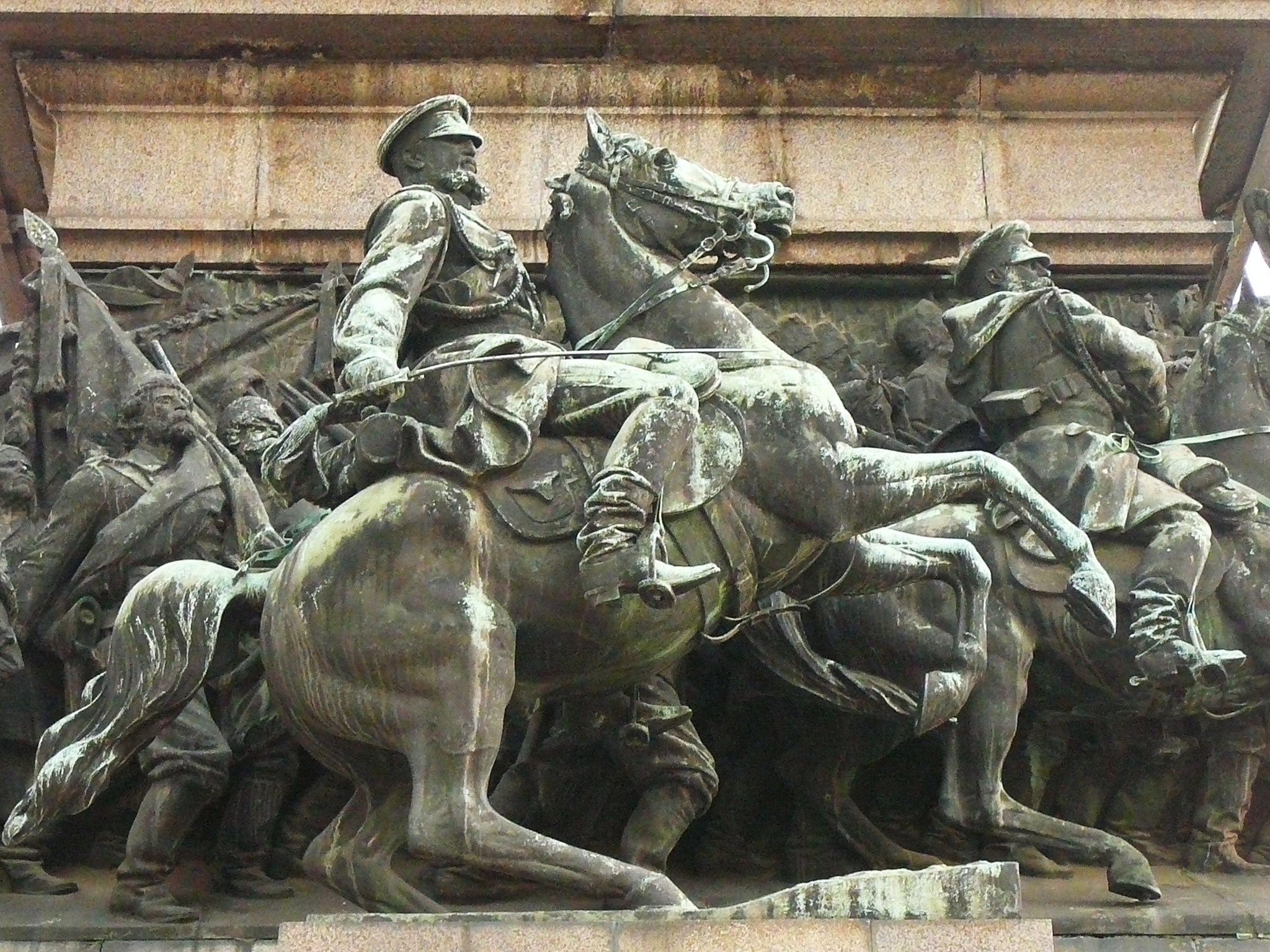

== See also ==
- Monument to Alexander II in Moscow
- Monument to Alexander II in Helsinki
- Google Earth view
