= Emilio Zocchi =

Italian sculptor

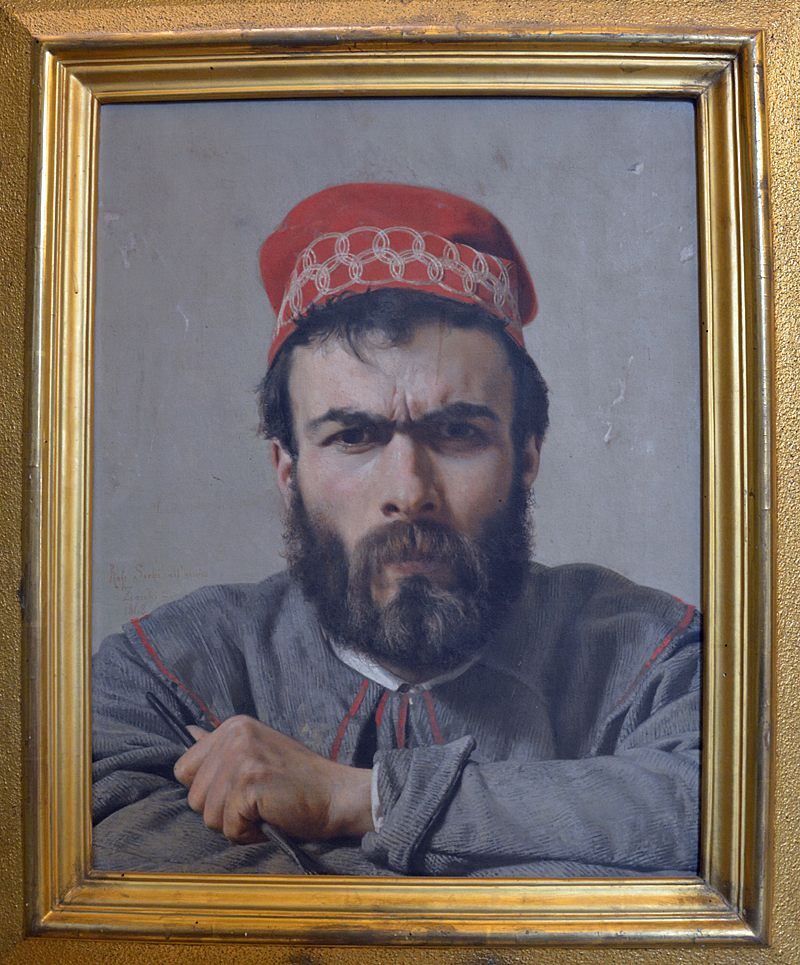
Emilio Zocchi, Portrait by Raffaello Sorbi

Emilio Zocchi (March 5, 1835 – January 10, 1913) was an Italian sculptor. He is best known for his busts, bas-reliefs and statuettes of classical and Renaissance individuals.

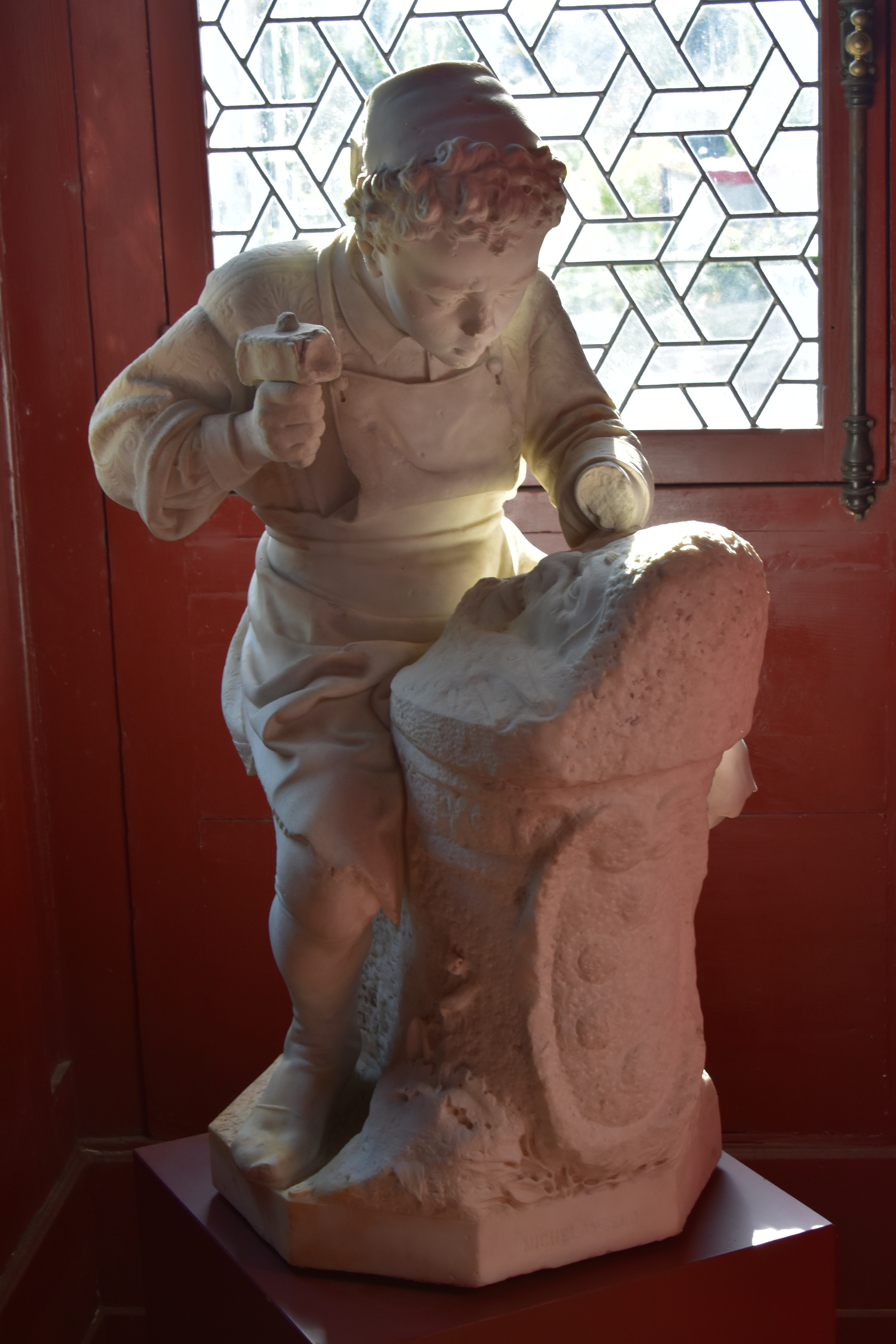
Young Michelangelo

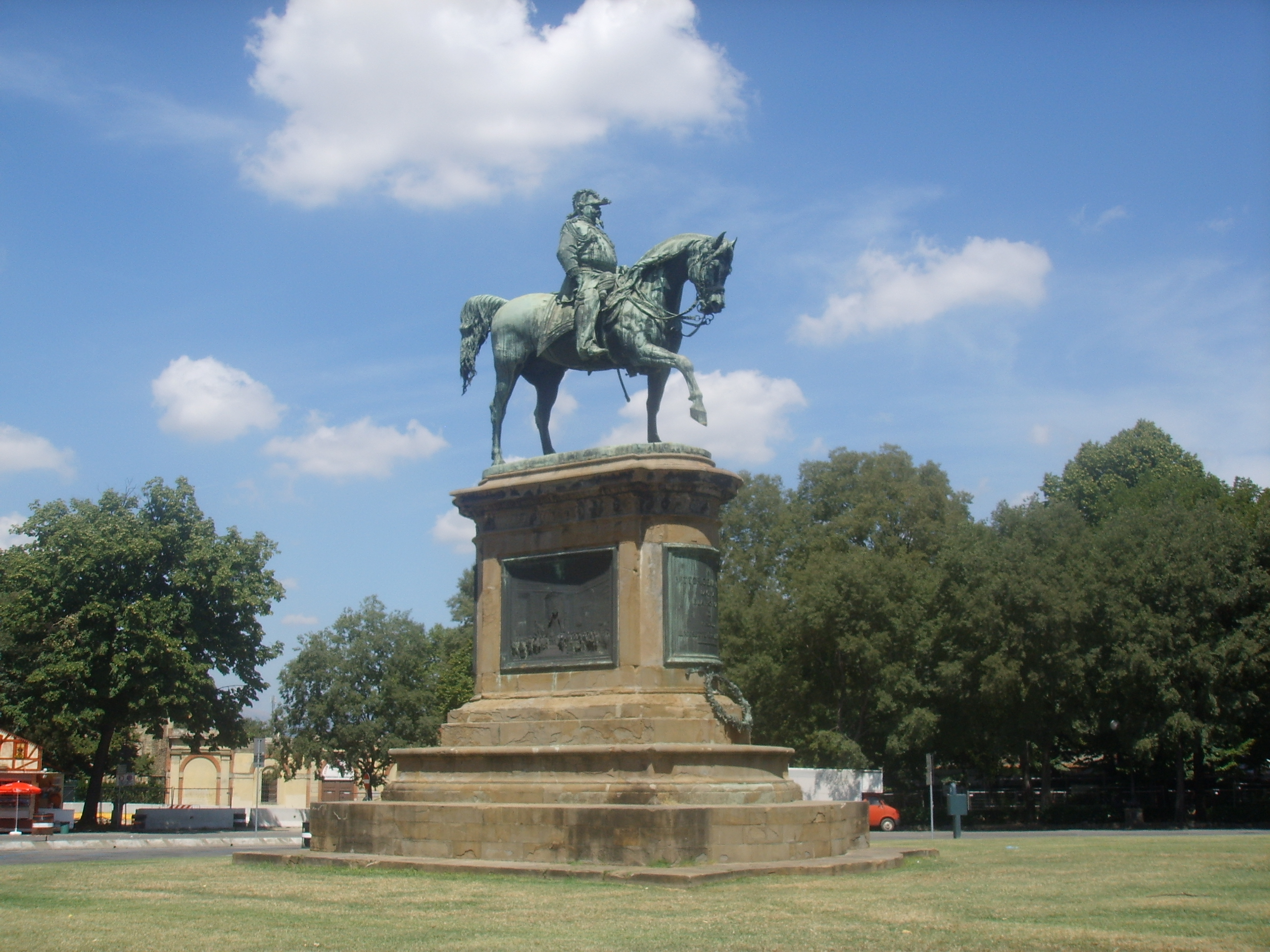
Monument to Vittorio Emmanuele in Parco delle Cascine

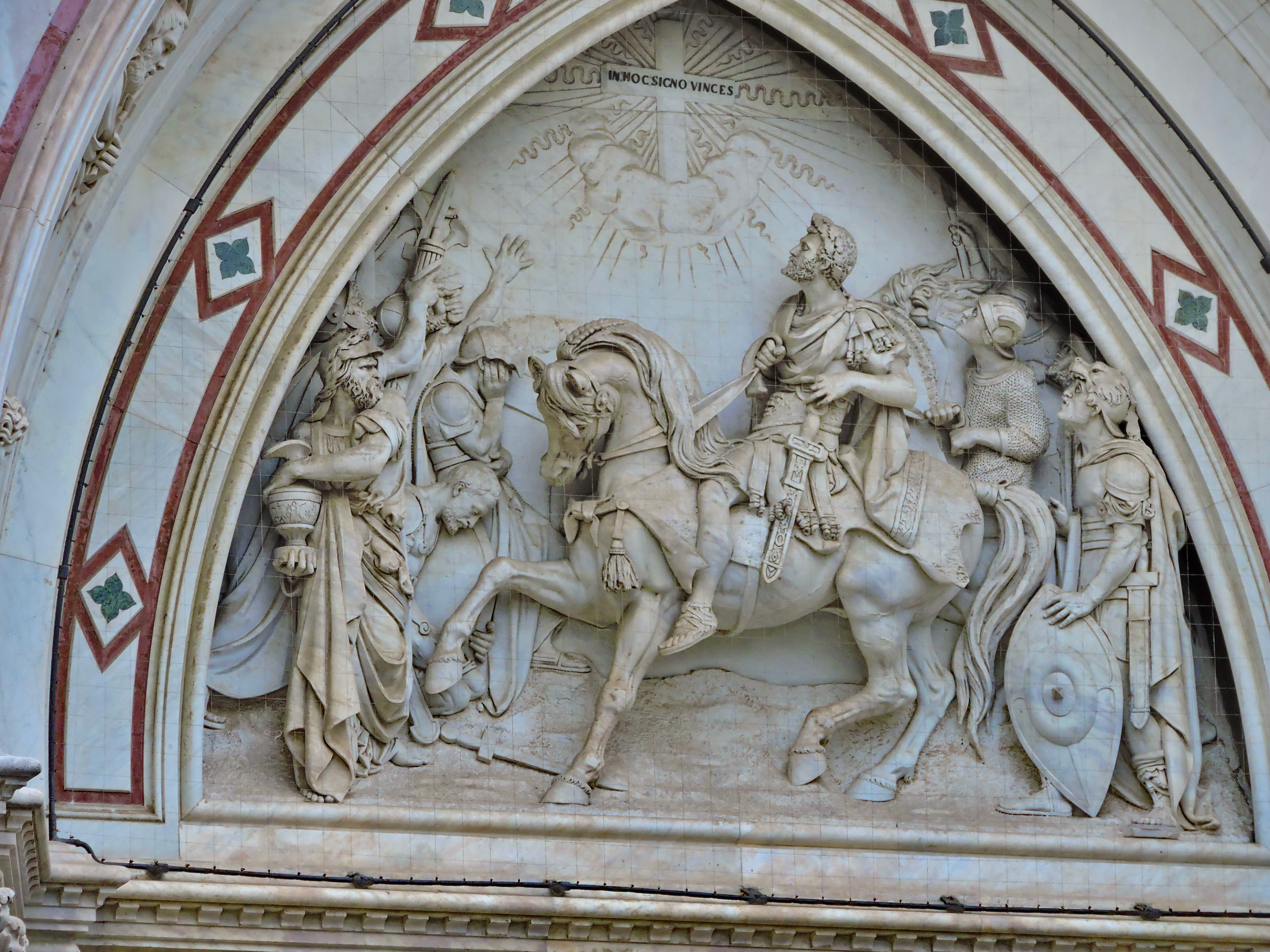
Vision of Constantine

Zocchi was born in Florence to parents of limited means. He studied with Girolamo Torrini, then with Aristodemo Costoli and subsequently with Giovanni Dupré at the Florentine Academy of Fine Arts. One of his first works was a Michelangelo as a young boy. His Young Bacchus won an award at the Vienna Exposition of 1873. He completed the bas-relief of Constantine's vision of the Cross at the entrance to the church of Santa Croce, Florence. He completed monuments to Benjamin Franklin and Vittorio Emanuele II.

Emilio, in turn, was the teacher of his son Arnoldo Zocchi and his cousin Cesare Zocchi. He died in Florence.

The artist's work can also be found at the cemetery in the Polish town of Nałęczôw. Zocchi's sculpture of Archangel Michael decorates the most beautiful grave of a young woman from a wealthy, aristocratic family.
