= Hercules and the Nemean Lion =

Hercules and the Nemean Lion may refer to one of the following works of art:

- Hercules and the lion of Nemea (Louvre Museum, L 31 MN B909), a painting on pottery
- Hercules Fighting the Nemean Lion (Zurbarán), a painting from 1634
- Hercules and the Nemean Lion (Klein), a sculpture in Berlin
- Hercules Strangling the Nemean Lion (Romanelli), a sculpture in Florence
