= Monument to Daniele Manin, Florence =

Coordinates: 43°45′21″N 11°15′02″E

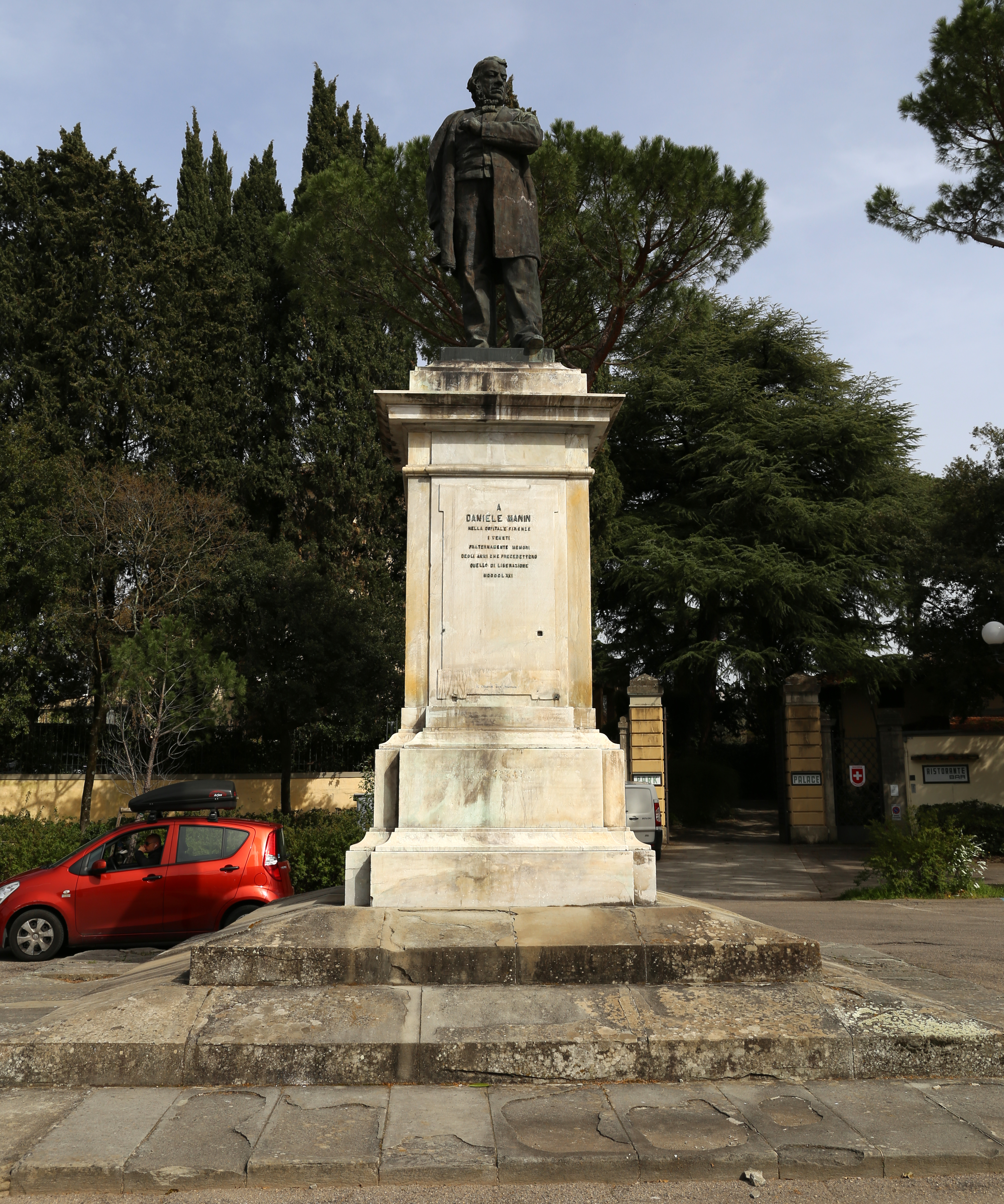
Monument to Daniele Manin

The Monument to Daniele Manin is located on Viale dei Colli in Piazzale Galileo in the neighborhood of Arcetri in the outskirts of Oltrarno in Florence, region of Tuscany, Italy.

In 1862, Venetians in Florence, who found themselves in exile after the Austrian reconquest of Venice planned to erect a monument to the patriot Daniele Manin (1804–1857). After the incorporation of Venice into Italy in 1866 the project was revived. After a contest, the statue was commissioned (1888) from the Venetian sculptor Urbano Nono. It was cast in 1889 by the Micheli foundry in Venice, and inaugurated in place in the center of Piazza d'Ognissanti in 1890, a piazza then renamed for Daniele Manin. In 1931 the architect Alfredo Lenzi of the Office of Fine Arts of the Comune of Florence banished the statue to piazzale Galileo, on the grounds that limited the enjoyment of the ancient architecture, then decided in 1937 to install the bronze statue of Hercules strangling the Nemean Lion by Romano Romanelli. The theme of this statue, a classical European hero subduing a barbaric African beast, appealed to the Fascist authorities engaged in the colonial subjugation of African people. Manin, himself in life however, was well accustomed to exile, having lived nearly the last decade of his life in France.

The monument to Manin underwent restoration in 2003–2004. Originally (as documented by the images and accounts of the time), the foundation had metal ornaments and a large bronze lion (which at the time severely criticized for the design), but these were scrapped during World War I. Manin is depicted as President of the Republic of San Marco at the meeting of the Council of Venice proclaiming the determination to resist at any cost the ultimatum of surrender made by Marshal Julius Jacob von Haynau of the Austrian army (right hand), during the siege of 1848–1849. The sculpture is placed on a base of Carrara marble bearing commemorative inscriptions on all four sides. The engineer of the monument was Moreno Perini. The base was decorated by Marco Fancelli.
