= Sappho Painter =

Unidentified ancient Greek vase painter

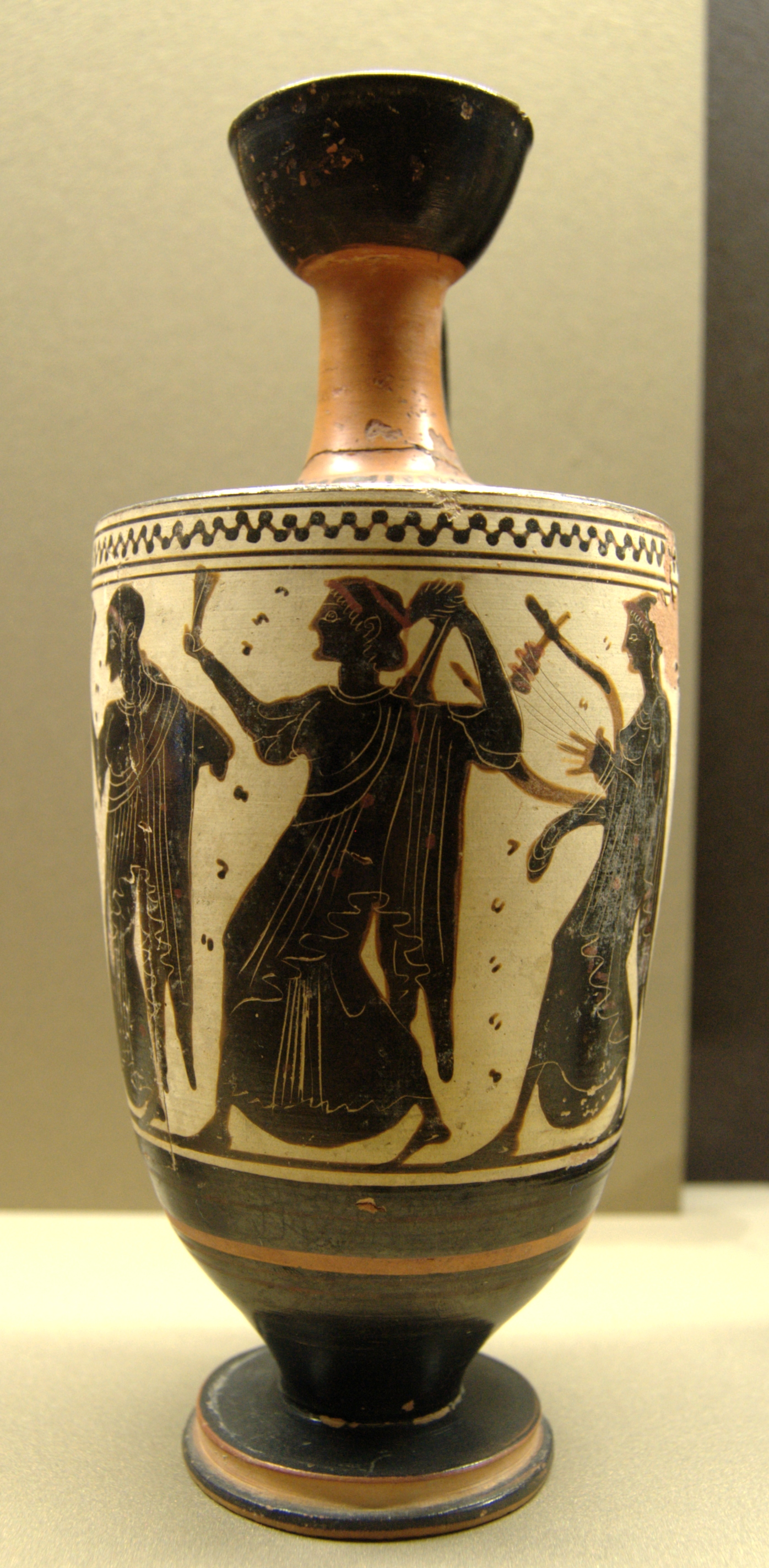
White ground technique lekythos attributed to the Sappho Painter depicting Achilles watching out for Polyxena. Louvre, Paris.

The Sappho Painter was an Attic black-figure vase painter, active c. 510–490 BCE.

The artist's name vase is a kalpis depicting the poet Sappho, currently held by the National Museum, Warsaw (Inv. 142333). The hand of the Sappho Painter has been identified on 95 vessels, 70% of which are lekythoi. Their work has also been identified on tomb wall slabs and epinetra.

Nearly half of this artist's paintings are of the white-ground style. They apparently avoided the then-predominant red-figure technique, but sometimes used Six's technique whereby figures are laid on a black surface in white or red and details are incised so that the black shows through. They were influenced and possibly trained by the Edinburgh Painter, and shared a workshop with the Diosphos Painter.
