= Diosphos Painter =

Unidentified ancient Greek vase painter

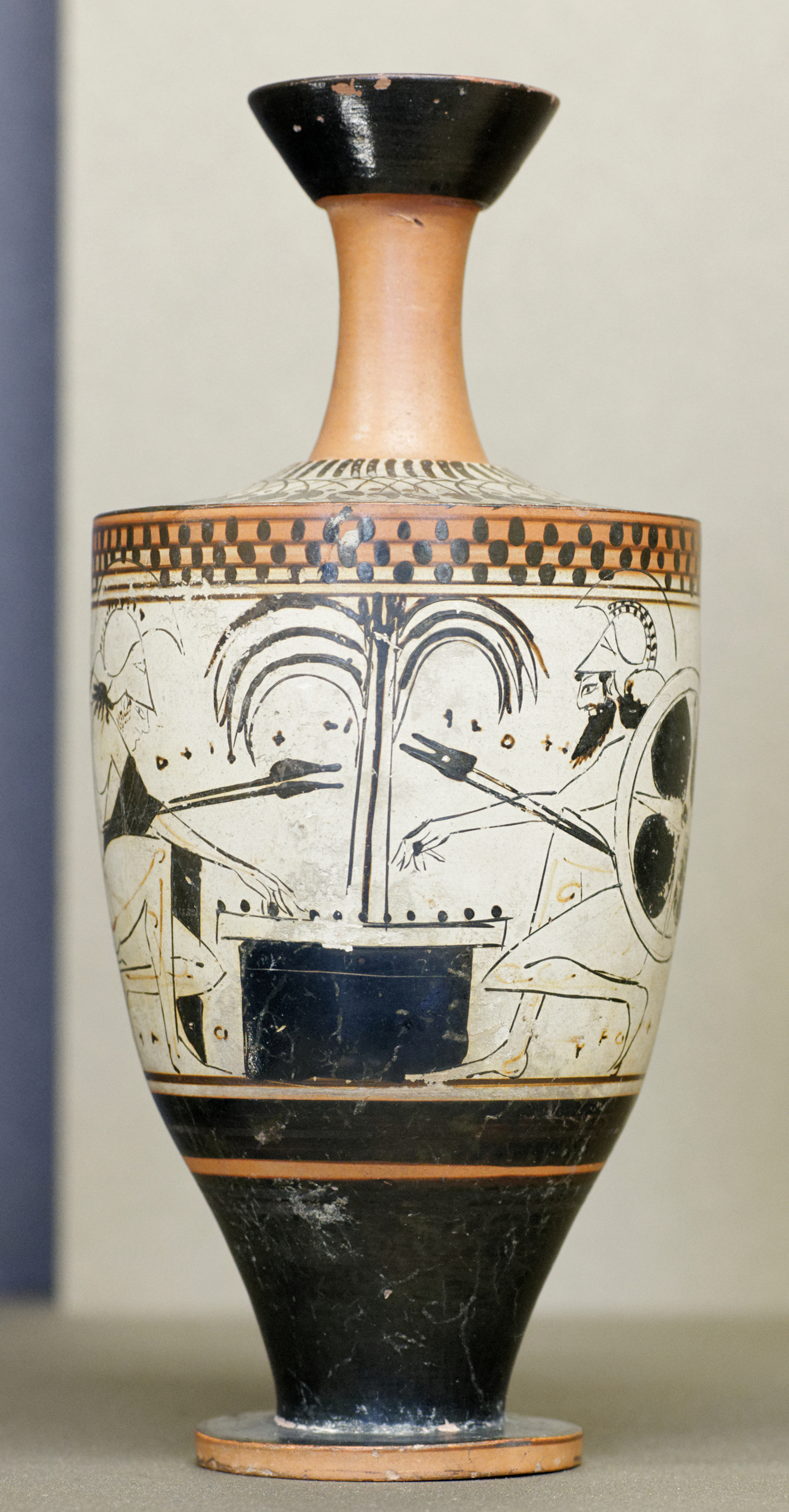
Lekythos of Achilles and Ajax playing a board game by the Diosphos Painter, c. 500 BC, Louvre

The Diosphos Painter was an Athenian Attic black-figure vase painter thought to have been active from 500–475 BCE, many of whose surviving works are on lekythoi.

The Diosphos Painter worked beside the Sappho Painter and both were pupils of the Edinburgh Painter. He was first identified by C.H.E. Haspels in her Attic Black-figure Lekythoi (Paris, 1936).

== See also ==
- List of Greek vase painters
