= Epinetron =

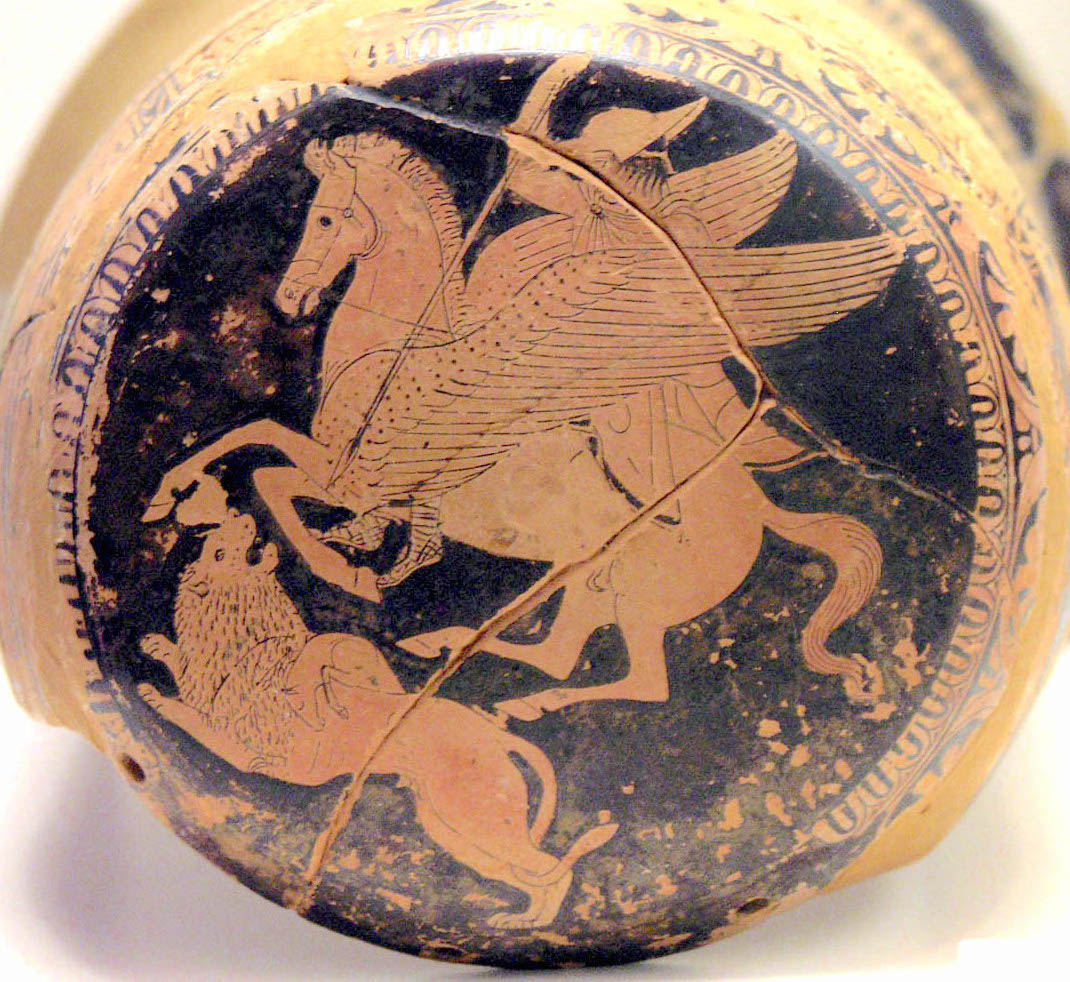
The base of an epinetron from Athens, depicting a lion and a pegasus

The epinetron (Greek: ἐπίνητρον, pl.: epinetra, ἐπίνητρα; "distaff"); Beazley also called them onoi, sg.: onos) was a shape of Attic pottery worn on the thighs of women during the preparation of wool, not unlike a thimble for the thigh. Decorated epinetra were placed on the graves of unmarried girls, or dedicated at temples of female deities.

Because of the strong association between wool-working and the Ancient Greek ideal of women and wives—as in the case of Penelope weaving in the Odyssey—it is a shape associated with the wedding.

The theme of its decoration tended to be related to its use. The top surface was often incised to make it rough in order to rub the wool fibers. There was often a female head placed at the closed end, where the knee was covered. Epinetra were often decorated, sometimes depicting black figure Amazon women, as in the case of an epinetron painted by the Sappho painter between 500 and 490 BCE.
