= Hercules and the lion of Nemea (Louvre Museum, L 31 MN B909) =

Ancient Greek lekythos

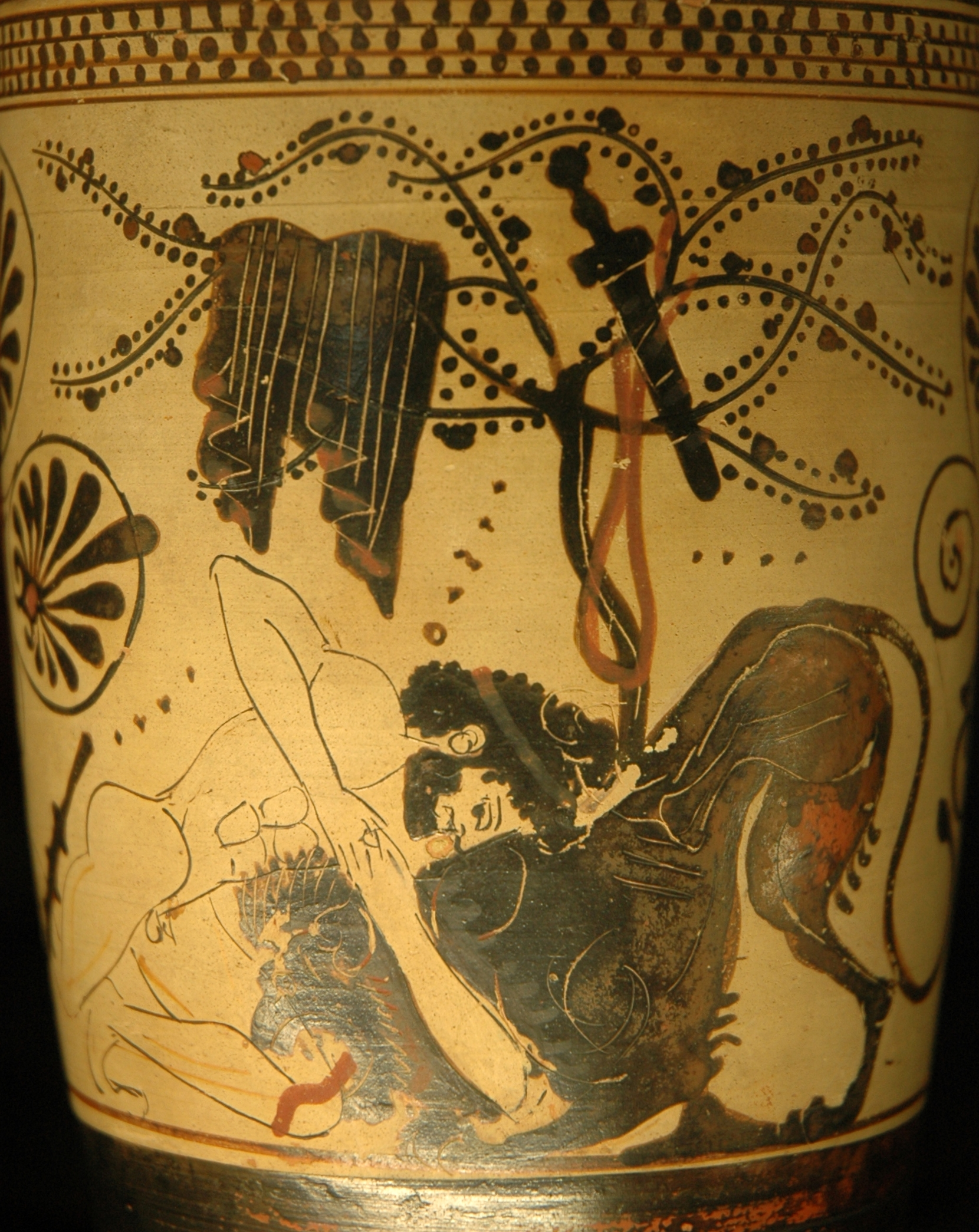
- Artist: Diosphos Painter
- Year: 500 – 450 BCE
- Catalogue: L 31 (MN B909)
- Medium: lekythos
- Dimensions: 25.7 cm (10.1 in); 29 cm diameter (11 in)
- Location: Louvre
- Accession: 1870

Heracles and the Lion of Nemea is a lekythos which is held at the Louvre Museum, with the representation of the first of the labours of Hercules, the slaying of the Nemean lion. It is coming from Athens, dated around 500 – 450 BCE and it was bought for Louvre Museum at 1870. It was probably created from the shop of a Tanagran artist. According to Beazley and Haspels it is attributed to the Diosphos Painter.

== Description ==
The painting of the lekythos presents Hercules naked, on his knee, struggling with the Nemean lion. He has caught the lion from the head and is smothering it with his arms while he has tied his fists. The image is framed by a tree with foliage and fruit. The garment of Hercules is hanging from a branch, while his sword and belt are hanging from another.

== Further references ==
- Flaceliere, R., Devambez, P., Heracles, Images & Recits (Paris, 1966)
- Haspels, C., Attic Black-figured Lekythoi (Paris, 1936)
- Kurtz, D., Athenian White Lekythoi (Oxford, 1975): PL.58.2
- Lissarrague, F. et al. (eds.), Ceramique et peinture Grecques, Modes d'emploi, Actes du colloque internat., Ecole du Louvre, April 1995 (Paris, 1999): 185
- Lissarrague, F., Greek Vases, The Athenians and their Images (2001): 163
- Perrot, G., Chipiez, C., Histoire de l'art dans l'antiquite, vols. IX-X (Paris, 1911–14): X, 691
