= Monument to the Italians Fallen in Africa, Siracusa =

War memorial in Siracusa, Sicily

Monument to the Italians Fallen in Africa
- Monumento ai Caduti italiani d'Africa
- Italy
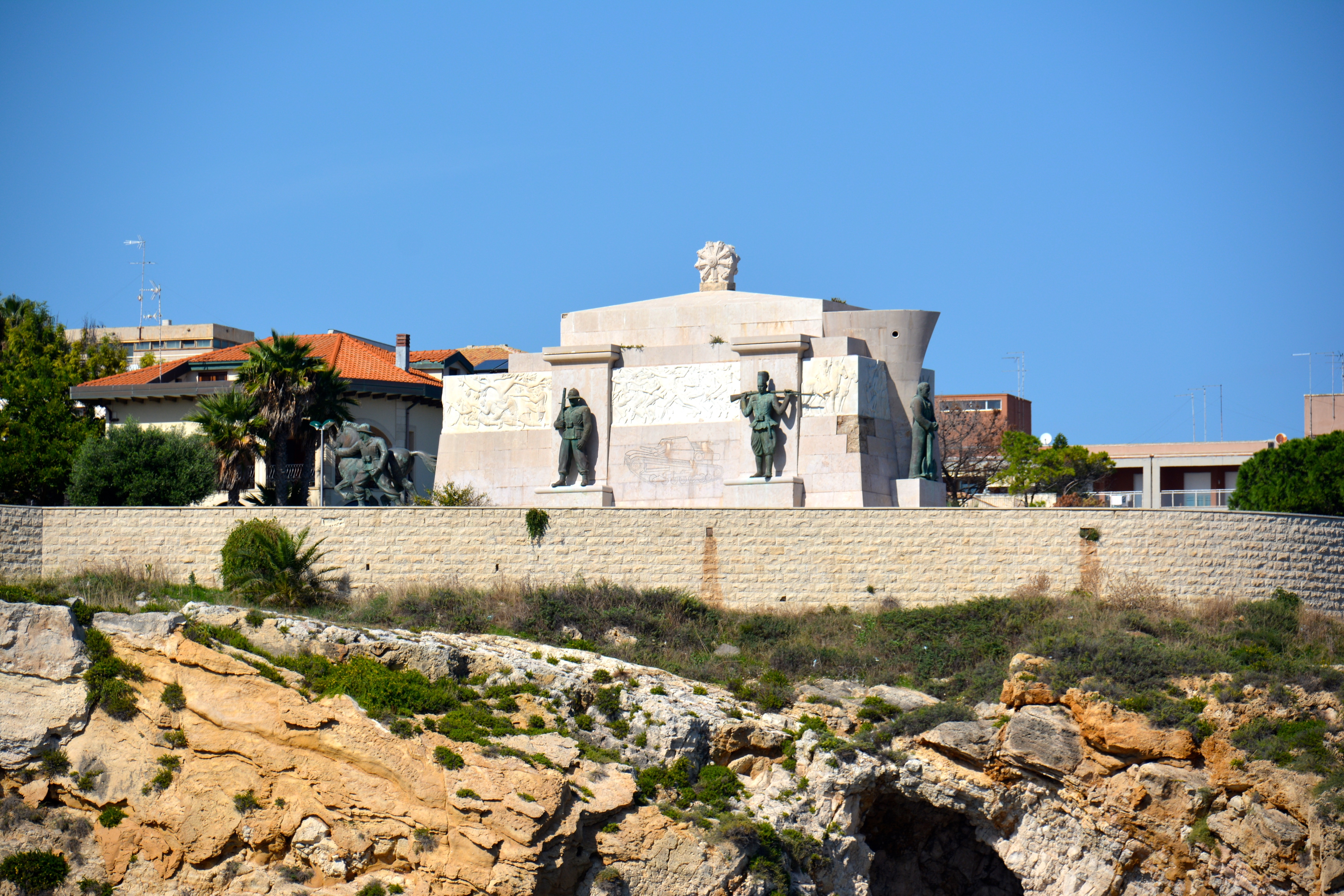
- Side-view of Monument
- For Italians who died and were missing in Ethiopian war
- Established: 1938
- Unveiled: 1960s
- Location: 37°04′41″N 15°17′48″E; Piazza dei Cappuccini near Syracuse, Sicily, Italy
- Designed by: Romano Romanelli

The Monument to the Fallen Italians in Africa (Italian: Monumento ai Caduti italiani d'Africa) is a Fascist era monument, dedicated to the Italians who died during the Ethiopian War (1935-1936), and assembled only in the 1960s on the seashore in Siracusa, region of Sicily, Italy. The monument, sculpted and designed by Romano Romanelli, was initially meant to be shipped in 1940 and assembled in Addis Ababa in Ethiopia; however, the Second World War prevented the transport, and led to its installation more than two decades later at this site, chosen because Syracuse had been a center for embarcation of troops for the African wars.

== Description ==
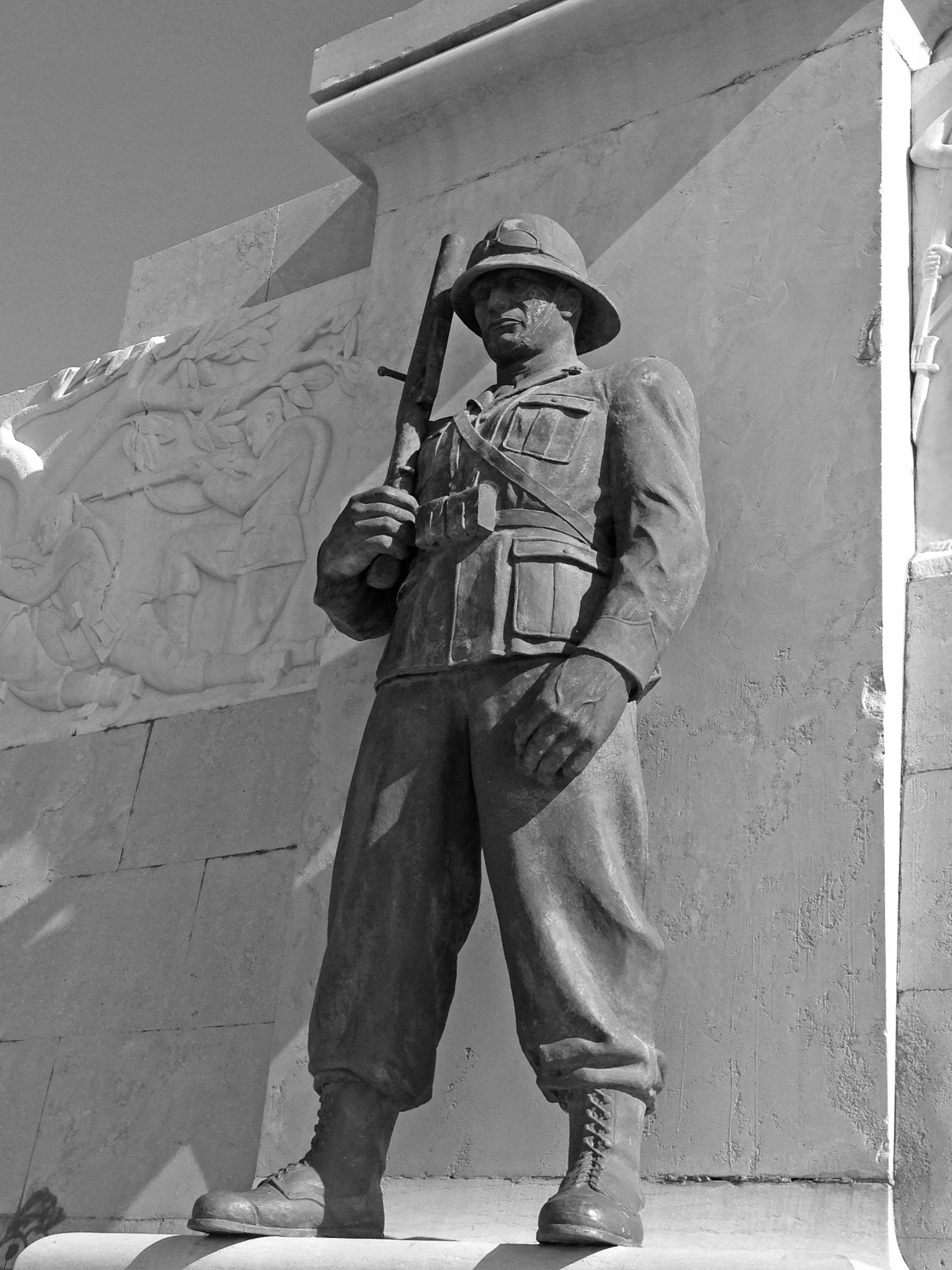
Italian infantry man

In June 1940, at the outbreak of Italian intervention in World War II, the bronze statues and sculpted marble reliefs were loaded on to ships for transport to Ethiopia. The outbreak of war prevented their shipment through the Suez canal, and the items were mothballed in storage. In 1952, the sculptor Romano Romanelli proposed its placement in Siracusa, at the present scenographic locale in the piazza dei Cappuccini overlooking the Ionian sea. The assembly of a Fascist monument was not without controversy.

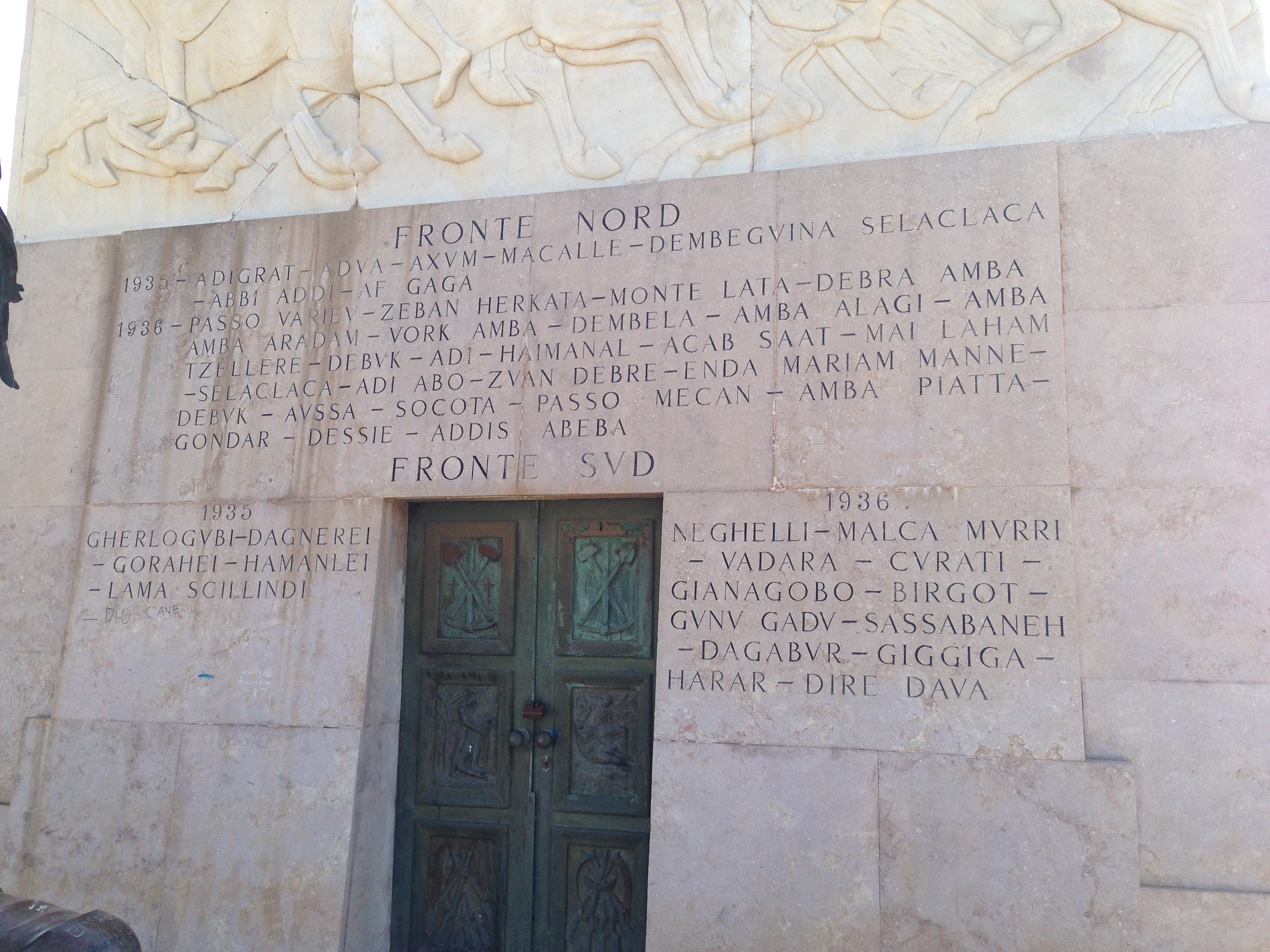
Entry portal

The monument recalls Ancient Roman monuments. Set atop a plinth, from the front it is approached by broad staircases. Towards the land is a larger-than-life bronze statue of a robust modern soldier on foot leading a horse, recalling the statues of the Dioscuri in the Quirinale fountain. Flanking the portal are the years and Ethiopian battle sites. The front of the monument has a boat prow, and faces the Ionian Sea towards Africa. Surrounding the monument are bronze sculptures of elements of the army, including infantry, navy, air force (with bomb), and local African muslim mercenaries, known as Askari. Bas-reliefs depict battles and a tank used in the war. The interior, mainly kept shuttered has a votive chapel. The monument is prone to vandalization and graffiti.

In 1999, veterans of the paratroop regiments place a plaque in memory of the second world war Lieutenant Coronel Giovanni Alberto Bechi Luserna. In 2012, the Siracusan cultural association, Lamba Doria, placed a plaque recalling the victims of the sinking of the Conte Rosso transport ship in 1941, while in the Siracusa port.

== Gallery ==
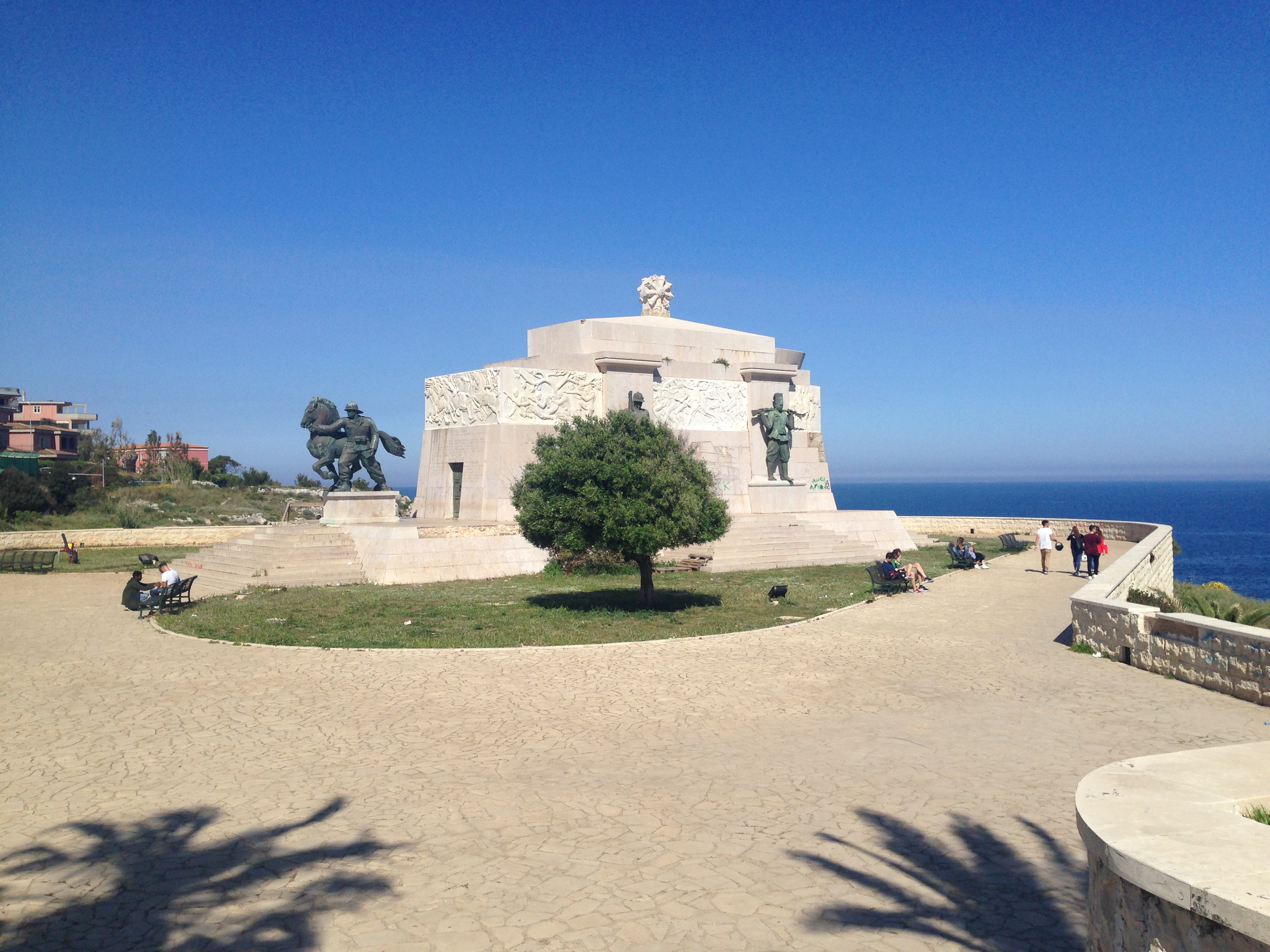

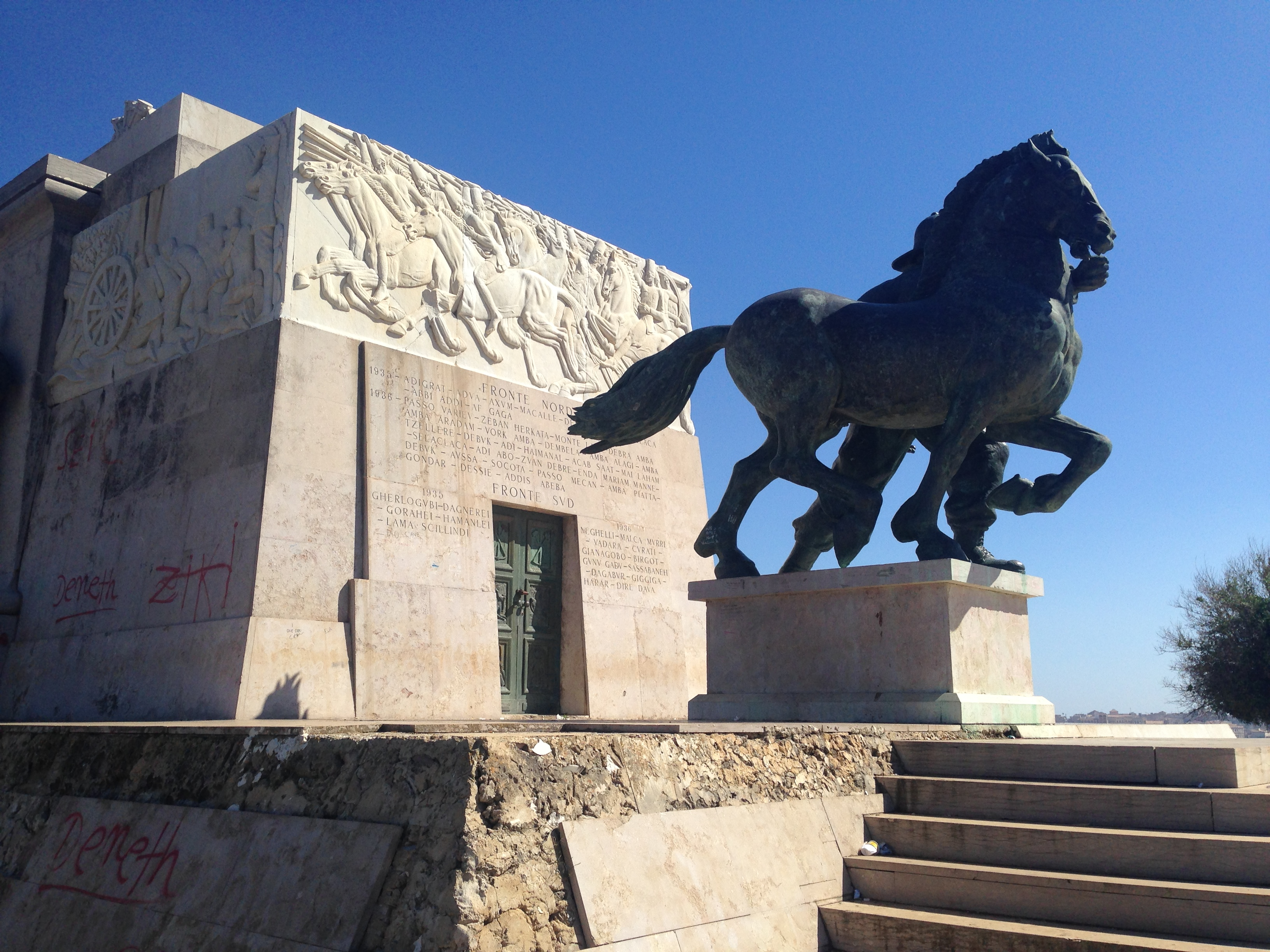

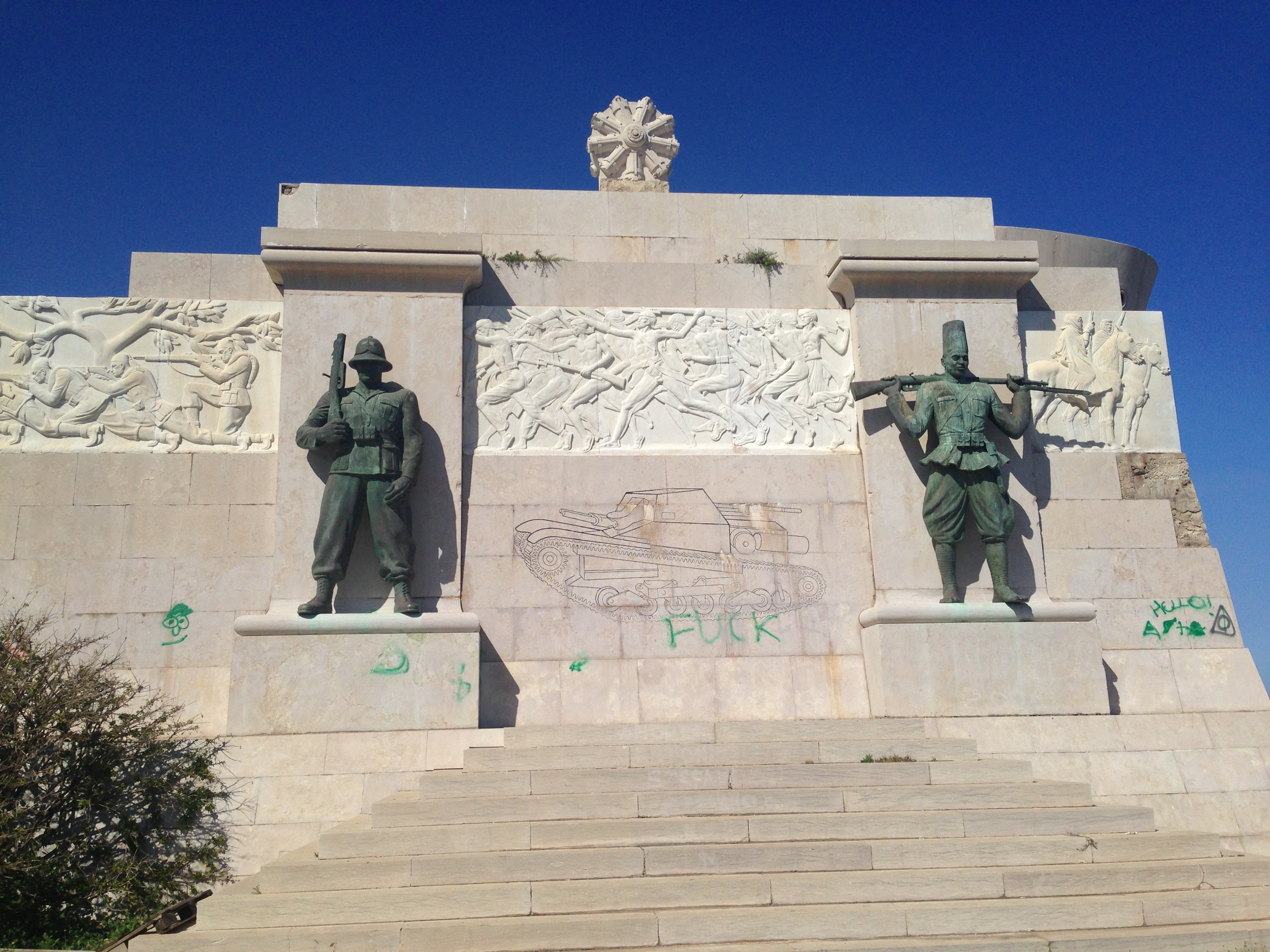

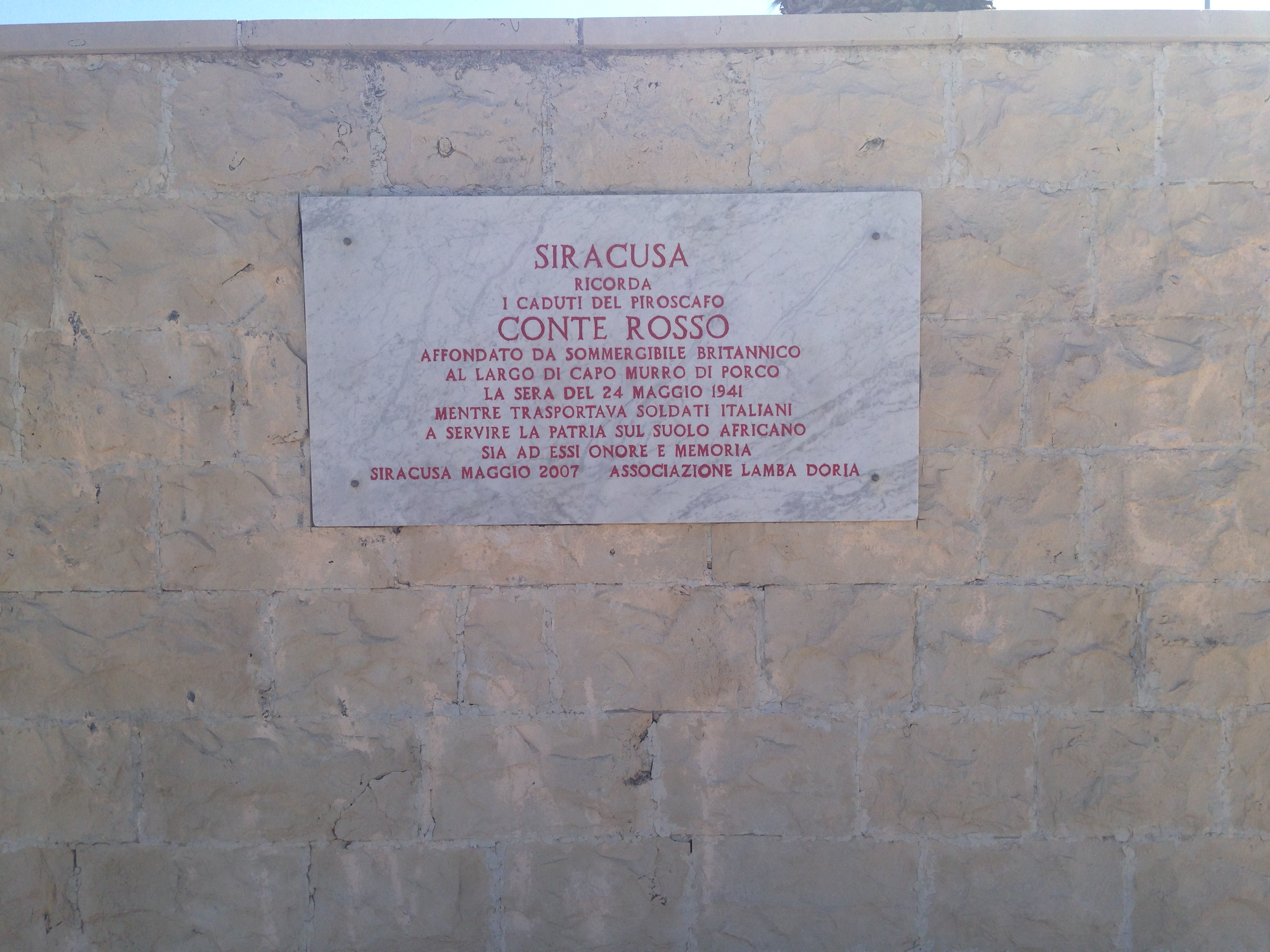
Plaque recalling the sinking of the Conte Rosso

== Notes ==
- Randazzo, Antonio (16 March 2017). "Monumento caduti". Memorie. antoniorandazzo.it (in Italian). Archived from the original on 21 February 2014.
- Belmonte, Carmen (15 March 2026). "Against iconoclasm: Romano Romanelli and the art of defascistization". Journal of Modern Italian Studies. 31 (2): 220–250. doi:10.1080/1354571X.2025.2571282. hdl:11577/3577959. ISSN 1354-571X.
