= Romano Romanelli =

Italian sculptor and naval officer (1882–1968)

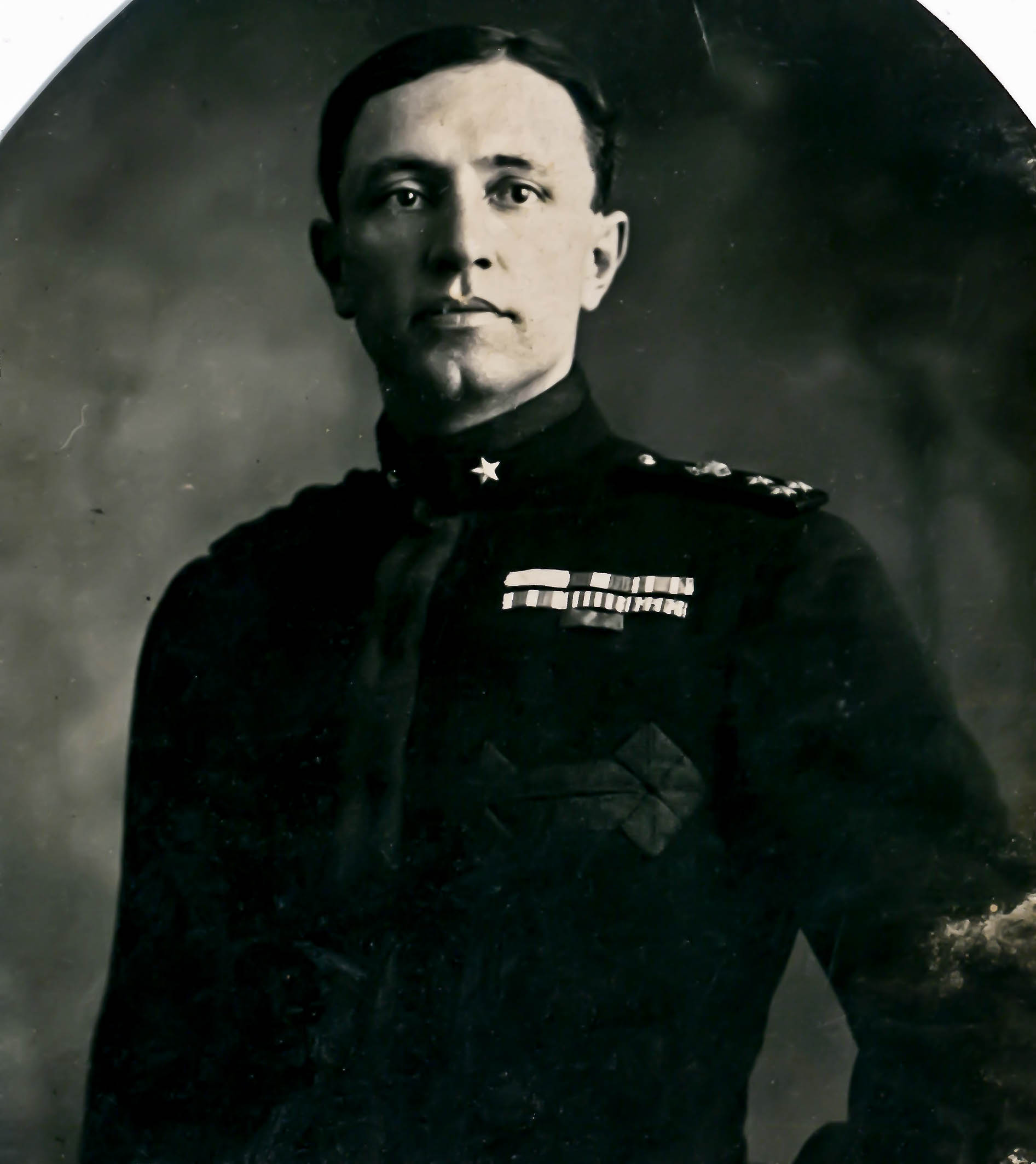
Romano Romanelli, 1914

Romano Romanelli (14 May 1882 – 25 September 1968) was an Italian artist, writer, and naval officer, known for his sculptures and his medals.

Romanelli was born in Florence, the son of sculptor Raffaello Romanelli. Romano's works occupy an important place in the Avant-Garde movement and form part of the ongoing artistic legacy of the Romanelli dynasty. He is buried in the Soffiano cemetery in Florence.

== Personal life ==
Florentine by descent on his mother's side, a descendant of Francesco Ferrucci, the famous Florentine Military Commissioner of the Medici family and a shipowner, and on his father's side, the son and grandson of renowned sculptors. His grandfather Pasquale Romanelli had been a collaborator of Lorenzo Bartolini, his father was the acclaimed and talented Raffaello Romanelli. He was a decorated Naval officer in the Italian Navy.

As a commanding officer in Gibraltar, Romano was to meet Dorothea Hayter, and she would become his wife in 1925. She was the daughter of Rev. William Thomas Baring Hayter. They had three children – a son, Raffaello Romanelli (b. 1926), and two daughters, Costanza (b.1928, d.2022) married to Bettino, 31st Baron Ricasoli (b.1922, d.2009) and Ilaria (b.1931, d.2024) married to Arnaud Faure (b.1930 – d.2015).

He was also a wine producer creating at the turn of the 20th century the Tenuta di Riseccoli winery in Greve in Chianti. He also held farms in Somalia, on the Jubba River, where he had plantations of banana trees and grapefruits. In 1965, his wife, whilst driving to the local hospital she had created, was sadly murdered by natives.

In 2012, his daughters Costanza and Ilaria donated their collection of around two thousand drawings by their father to the Florentine Galleria d’Arte Moderna housed in the Palazzo Pitti.

== Naval service ==
As a boy under the guidance of his father, Romano showed an aptitude for sculpting, and it seemed that he would follow the family tradition of sculpture. But Romano first found a career in the Italian Navy.

After studying mathematics at Pisa University, Romano attended the Italian Naval Academy at Livorno. As a cadet and junior officer in the Italian Navy, he made five voyages, visiting the Mediterranean, North America, and Europe, including the Azores and Madeira. He served for three years in the Far East, including China, Japan and Siberia, the Dutch and British East Indies, the Indian Ocean, and the Red Sea. He left service in 1910 for medical reasons and began to work as a sculptor. Recalled into the Navy for the Italo-Turkish War in 1911–12, he served as a navigator in an armed cruiser patrolling in the area between Corsica and Palermo, Sicily. Recalled once again in 1914 at the outbreak of World War I, he was appointed officer in command of the Southern Adriatic and Ionian Sea. He subsequently commanded an auxiliary cruiser, and in 1916–1919, he was based in Gibraltar, where he was the Italian naval officer assigned to co-operate with other allied navies protecting merchant vessels from U-boat attacks during their passage between the Straits of Gibraltar and the Italian coast. He was decorated and became an honorary member of the British Legion. His time in service and voyages were to have a lasting influence on his artwork: in 1940 he wrote "Romanticismo Velico" (Vallecchi, Firenze, 1940), a memory of his naval life from childhood to naval service in Africa and the Far East.

== First works ==
During his leaves from naval service, Romano found time to develop his sculpting skills. His personal style continued to evolve through his lifetime as he sought to master his craft. In 1905 and 1906, he made two portraits, including one of his brother Renzo. In 1906, Romano started work on his bronze monument, Hercules strangling with the Nemean lion, a piece was presented at the Biennale at Venice in 1910, then also at the Universal Exhibition in Rome in 1911. In 1930, a statue dedicated to the Patriot Manin was removed from Piazza Ognissanti in Florence, and in its place, by 1937, this work was set in place as a gift to the city of Florence in 1935 by Angelo Orvieto. The highly defined muscular tension and precarious equilibrium between the two antagonists recalls the Hellenistic sculpture: I lottatori (The Wrestlers) found at the Uffizi; however, by the 1930s, the sculptures would have been popular with the fascist authorities, since Mussolini self-identified with Hercules. The sculpture alluded to Mussolini's Italy subjugation and conquest of African countries and lands.

== Schooling ==
Romano was traditionally schooled at his father's studio, learning the techniques of modelling clay. Whilst gaining a grounding in the technical elements of sculpting from his father, Romano's style was different from the outset. The development of his own personal style was aided by frequenting the studio of other sculptors, initially Giussepe Renda from Naples and later Domenico Trentacoste. At Trentacoste's studio, he also came into contact with Maffio Maffii. Another key influence in the formation of his own unique style was Vincenzo Gemito, whose studio in Naples he visited several times. He inspired in him a love for nature seen through the ideal image created by the Greek masters of the Hellenistic period. During his time in the navy, one particular trip would take him to the Greek remains of the Valle dei Tempi in Agrigento, Sicily, which he would draw upon as inspiration in his later work. While Romano would never part ways with this Classical grounding, he would go on to achieve a commendable feat, that of creating sculpture that was on the one hand paying homage to Antiquity and on the other toying with newfound concepts of Artistic Modernity. This juxtaposition is essentially the reason why Romano's sculpture is perceived to be unique.

== A year in Paris ==
It was the year 1910–11 that would point him in this direction. Romano entered Paris when the French Avant-Garde movement was in prominence, and therefore became immersed in an environment in which contemporary visions of art were blooming. Romano also frequented the Louvre, where he drew inspiration from French Classicism. He studied in various studios, notably that of Auguste Rodin, where he was influenced by the master himself and fellow sculptors Antoine Bourdelle and Aristide Maillol. Romano befriended the painter Maurice Denis, whose work became a point of reference. Denis would later, along with the sculptor Paul Maximilien Landowski, nominate Romano to become a member of the prestigious "Institut de France" and the "Académie des Beaux-Arts". Romano kept company with many prominent figures of the artistic community as well as being exposed to great works of art, including Gauguin’s exotic Tahitian beauties. The oriental aspects of Gauguin’s work as well as Romano’s military voyages to China are deemed responsible for the synthetic style seen in Romano’s figure formation. Romano’s most notable work to emerge from this time was Il Risveglio di Brunilde – Brunhild’s Awakening in 1913, inspired by Richard Wagner’s Opera "Siegfried" which was being performed in Paris at the time. The American dancer Isadora Duncan was the lead role, and she posed for Romano initially in Paris and later at Viareggio. Romano was fascinated with the unique bodily form displayed in Duncan’s dancing; the freedom of her movement was captivating for the artistic eye.

== Post First World War ==
Following the First World War, Romano dedicated himself wholeheartedly to a career in sculpture. Romano’s style underwent a transformative period as the themes of his work became increasingly influenced by the setting in which he found himself. Eva – Eve (1918), with her soft lines, is still reminiscent of Rodin. However, La Signora Giglioli – Mrs. Giglioli (1922) looks more to the Italian Avant-Garde movement, as does Leda con il Cigno – Leda and the Swan (1923). Mario Tinti suggested that Romano's military duties significantly impacted his style. He writes that Romano "began to strip his art of every psychological, dynamic, and colourist influence that he had unconsciously derived from Rodin – all his efforts from now on were directed towards making his art more severe, and more religious, more architectural and absolute – in a word, more 'Italian' ". The validity of these words lies in the abundance of Romano's works linked to Italian Nationalism and Classicism, but his work continued to display traces of his pre-war influences. The first of many large commissions to come his way was the Equestrian statue of General Botha for his Memorial (1928), which stands outside the parliament in Cape Town, originally a commission to his father Raffaello Romanelli which he took over upon his death. After World War II, Romano's links with South Africa also gave his workshop a role in the creation of the historical friezes for the Voortrekker Monument in South Africa. The design was created by four South African sculptors, Hennie Potgieter, Laurika Postma, Frikkie Kruger and Peter Kirchhoff, who spent five years creating plaster panels. These panels were sent to Florence, where Romanelli had a large studio with machinery and technical equipment. Romano directed 50 chisellers replicating the plaster designs in Quercetta marble.

== The Two Boxers ==
Pugile in Combattimento – The Fighting Boxer (1926), bought by Minister Augusto Turati for the Foro Italico stadium in Rome and shown at the "Mostra del Novecento" in 1929, bears witness to Romano's style of the post-war period. From the plaster version preserved at Galleria Romanelli, the masculine lines, accompanied by finer details, give the sculpture its strong impact. The socks, the livery, the gloves and the concentration on the facial expression and the action stance of the athlete all reveal a style which leans towards the pursuit of verisimilitude. Following on from this theme is the Il Pugile Ferito – Wounded Boxer (1929–1931), inspired by the beautiful Hellenistic bronze Il Pugilatore in Riposo housed at the National Museum, Rome (Palazzo Massimo alle Terme), is distinctive of Romano's style of this period. The similarity can be seen particularly in the positioning of the hands and the head turned towards the right. There are still undercurrents of Rodin, who remained a constant source of inspiration, as the rough surface of the bronze and the deep shadows highlighting the volumes and inspiration from the sober and introverted sculpture of Charles Despiau, author of a bronze "l'Atlète"

== Work under Fascism ==
Romanelli was a prominent sculptor during the fascist regime of Benito Mussolini. He completed a portrait bust for Mussolini, and designed the monumental bas-relief of Mussolini on horseback for the Torre della Rivoluzione in Brescia. The bas-relief Romolo che Traccia il Solco (Romulus Ploughing the Furrow) (1925–32) complements the rhetoric of the regime. The bronze was completed in 1930 and was purchased by the regime for the Palazzo delle Corporazioni in Rome. The original plaster is conserved in the Galleria Romanelli in Florence. The subject is the drawing of the city boundaries of Rome by its founder Romulus. The composition plays with the concept of force, the force of the man handling the plough and the counterforce of the ox. It is the equilibrium of this force, which underpins the birth of the capital. His adopted style is simple and incisive, inspired by the primitivism of the Avant-Garde and the Greek archaic sculptures. Here Romano is elaborating on the research he did into these styles in his earlier days. Romanelli's expression of the message gives a sense of immediacy.

In 1932, through a number of newspaper editorials, published in La Nazione, Florence's main daily, he criticized the poorly thought-out project by the architect Mazzoni for the new Firenze Santa Maria Novella railway station A constructive debate resulted in the final choice of the project designed by Gruppo Toscano, composed of Giovanni Michelucci, Pier Niccolò Berardi, Italo Gamberini, Nello Baroni, Leonardo Lusanna and sponsored by the architect Marcello Piacentini. Mussolini personally praised the young architects. He took part in the art competitions at the 1936 Summer Olympics.

== The 1930s ==
During this decade, Romano was inundated with prestigious public commissions. The Justice of Trajan (La Giustizia di Traiano) (1933–34) is perhaps Romano's most significant commission for the regime. The monument's sincere style is described by Soffici as "synthetic realism". It was produced in white marble for the Palazzo di Giustizia, the law court in Milan, where it is still today and the original plaster is preserved in the Galleria Romanelli in Florence. The theme is inspired by Dante’s Canto X of Purgatory, in which the Roman emperor Trajan administers justice on behalf of the widowed woman kneeling in front of him. The composition is inspired by Roman scenes of triumph, staged within the frame of Classical columns. Several human figures are portrayed in this tale: in the centre, the Emperor on horseback, and the widow. In the foreground, a group of soldiers taking part in the parade of triumph: amongst these figures, previous works of Romano can be recognised, such as the portrait of Mussolini, and those of Romano's intellectual and artist friends Giovanni Papini, Ardengo Soffici, Domenico Giuliotti and Maffio Maffii. On the right other famous works can be spotted, Il "Risveglio di Brunilde" and the "Gesù Bambino", "Il portatore d’Acqua", "Giano e la Vergine" and finally the "Ritratto di Fanciulla Etrusca".

His Equestrian Monument Dedicated to George Castriot Skanderbeg (1938), whose plaster stands in the Galleria Romanelli, was made in bronze to be exhibited in Tirana after Italy's invasion of the territory, but ended in Piazza Albania in Rome, where it still stands today.

George Castriot Skanderbeg is an Albanian national hero and was a 15th-century nobleman who led Christian resistance against the Ottoman Muslims. The son of an Albanian prince, he was kidnapped by the Ottoman court in 1423, becoming the pupil of Sultan Murad II and forced to engage in military duties on behalf of his empire. He deserted at the battle of Niš in Skënderbej in Albania and organised a rebellion against the sultan and defended the region against the Ottoman Empire for 25 years.

Lo Scultore – The Sculptor (1926–1930) is similar to The Pugile in its display of physical force; it was purchased during the second Mostra del Novecento by the Minister Turati for the Stadio Nazionale di Roma. The piece represents a symbol of force through its physical pose; strength for Romanelli was essential to his work, representing physical and moral force.

Today, "Lo Scultore" is the logo/emblem for the six generations of artists who have passed through the doors of the historical Romanelli studio.

Giano e la Vergine – Giano and the Virgin (1929–30), represents the union between the Roman god Janus and the nymph Camesena, who is described as the Muse of Song, and is represented by Carducci as autochthonous Child of the Soil, and from whom the Italic race was born according to an extremely ancient legend (Macrobius). The theme is inspired by the rediscovery of original Roman sources, a discourse which permeated the fascist rhetoric of the period. The nationalistic undertones and Classical style were not accidental, in the wake of the tragedies Romano witnessed firsthand during the First World War. Stylistically this group is both hard and synthetic but the gesture tender in the acting of hugging.

One of Romano's last works was from a competition for a large commission which he won at the end of the decade for the Monument to the Italians Fallen in Africa (1938–39). Stylistically, this piece is very similar to his other works of the period, emitting great strength and force. The work honours the soldiers who died in Italy's colonial conquests, including a tomb for an unknown soldier. It was intended for Addis Ababa, Ethiopia; however, with the outbreak of the Second World War, the shipment was interrupted, and the piece remained in storage. Later on in the 1950s the parts were put together in Syracuse, Sicily, under the emblematic title of "Monument to the Soldier and Worker" where it still stands today. This was a strategic port for the Italian military at the time, when they departed for the colonies. The monument is composed of six statues; one is not original, as it was lost in storage and, as such, was substituted by a replica of smaller dimensions. The marble frieze is a very distinctive feature of the piece.

Following the signing of the Pact of Steel between the Kingdom of Italy and Germany on May 22, 1939, Romano became publicly extremely critical of the regime, having advised it strongly against this alliance. He was then pursued by the regime, which issued an arrest warrant for him and he went into hiding, first in the Tuscan countryside, on one of his estates, where he was eventually denounced by one of his own farmers, but managed to escape and subsequently hid in the Vatican until the end of the war. In the meantime, his wife Dorothea hid and gave refuge in a secret space below the roof of their family home in Florence to a number of Jews and other personalities pursued by the regime, such as the German artist and Florentine resident but anti-Nazi, Baroness Gisele von Stockhausen, for her knowledge of the area and drawing skills necessary for the drawing of military maps. A friendly member of the Italian Military Police, the Carabinieri, would warn Dorothea the day before searches were planned in the area, so that she could let the refugees run into hiding in other caches outside the home.

After the war, he was nominated Professor of Sculpture at the Italian Academy of Fine Arts, Florence and held the chair for sculpture until 1953. A seal of approval for his artistic accomplishments.

== Medals and portraiture ==
Influenced by the style of Antoine Bourdelle and Maurice Denis and Greek Archaism, Romano created many bronze medals reverting to the illustrious tradition of Greek coins and some of the medal-making of the Quattrocento. Proclaimed by critics to be the most beautiful to be produced since those of Giovanni da San Gallo in the Fifteenth century. Before the outbreak of World War I, he was commissioned by Gabriele D'Annunzio to create a limited series of four medals, "Medaglie di Guerra", to honour the valiant. Medaglia per l'Aviazione in Marina, Medaglia per la Reale Nave Andrea Doria, Medaglia per la Corazzata 36PN, Medaglia per la Sommergibilie S1 & S2

Inheriting his father's skill for portraiture, Romano was later commissioned to create many portraits of renowned Italian writers and artists of the day, such as Giovanni Papini (1929), exhibited in the Pitti Palace, and of A. Soffici (1930). He additionally sculpted international figures, notably the Duke of Aosta (1932), Chiquita Esteban de Canongo (1922), Princess Aspasia wife of Alexander, King of the Hellenes, Count Paolo Guicciardini (1928) and Mussolini on Horseback (1933) for Addis Ababa.

== Presidency of the Royal Academy of Italy ==
Romano declined numerous invitations to assume positions of presidency. Firstly in 1934 when he was offered the presidency of the Royal Academy of Italy, in Florence. Then, in 1942, the presidency of the Instituto d’Arte in Venice. He finally took up the offer for the former position due to pressure exerted on him by his associates. He was then named an Accademico d’Italia

== Voortrekker Monument ==
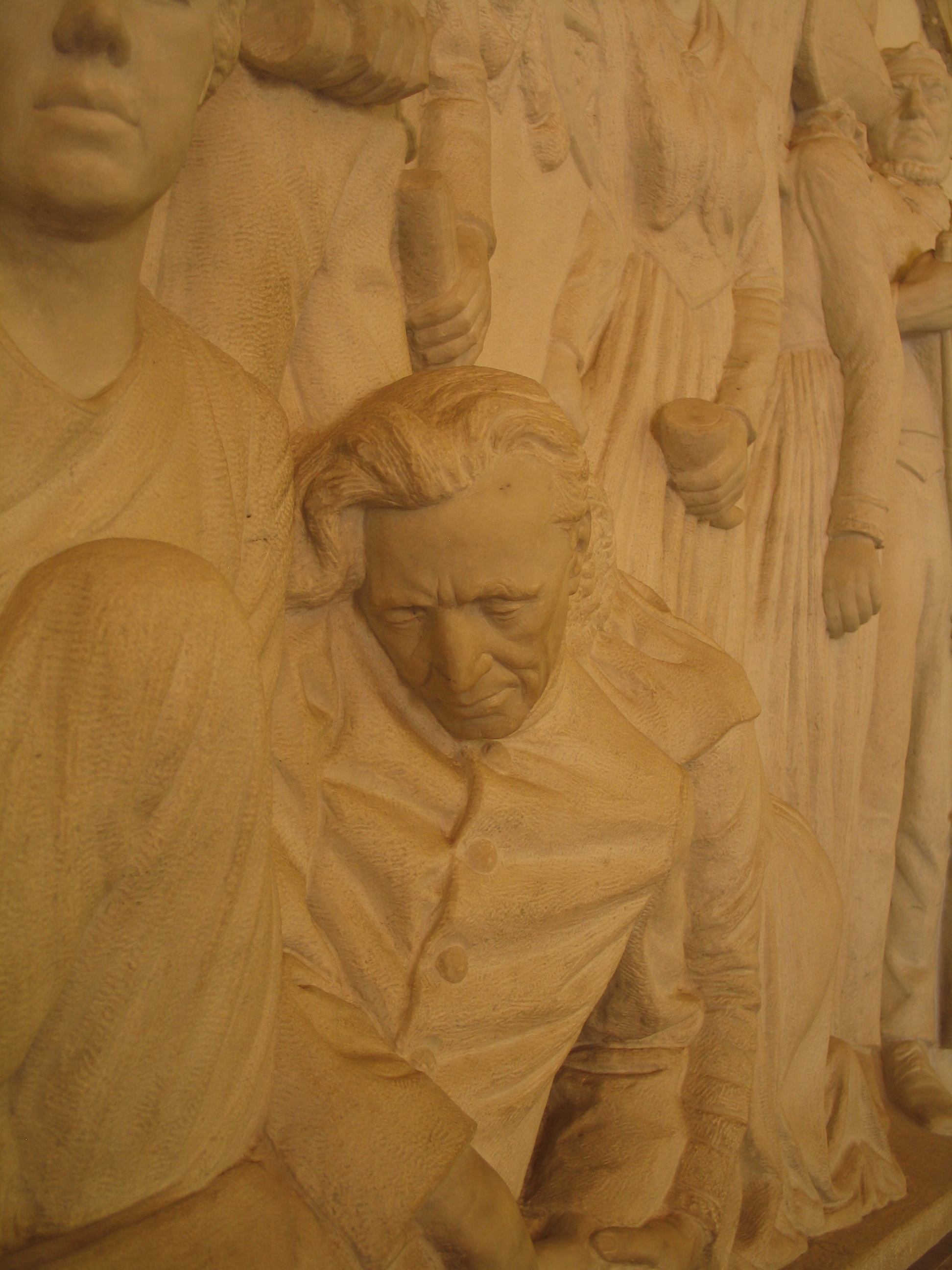
Detail of the historical frieze at the Voortrekker monument

After World War II, Romanelli's workshop was involved in the creation of the historical friezes for the Voortrekker Monument in South Africa. The design was created by four South African sculptors, Hennie Potgieter, Laurika Postma, Frikkie Kruger and Peter Kirchhoff, who spent five years creating plaster of Paris panels. These were sent to Florence, where Romanelli had a large studio with machinery and technical equipment. He directed 50 chisellers replicating the plaster of Paris designs in Quercetta marble.

== Medals and honours ==
- Medaglia di Bronzo al Valore

== Selected works ==
Most of his bronze works were produced by the reputed bronze works foundry Fonderia Gusmano Vignali.

- 1906, Ritratto del Fratello, Bronze
- Ritratto di R.Carpi", Bronze
- 1907 Hercules Strangling the Nemean Lion, Bronze, Piazza Ognissanti, Florence
- 1910 Studio per San Paolo, Bronze
- La Dolente", Bronze
- 1911 Bimbo Serio e Bimbo che Piange, Plaster
- Ritratto di Elis de’ Piccolellis"
- 1912 Il Portatore d’Acqua, Bronze
- 1913 Risveglio di Brunilde e Testa per il risveglio di Brunilde, Bronze
- 1914 Il Bacio, Bronze
- "Medaglione del Forgiatore"
- Medaglie di Guerra", Bronze – (Medaglia per l'Aviazione in Marina, Medaglia per la Corazzata 36PN, Medaglia per il Sommergibile S1 eS2, Medaglia per la Real Nave Andrea Doria)
- "Checchina" (Galleria d'Arte Moderna di Firenze)
- Ascoltando Chopin" (Galleria Civica d'Arte Moderna di Torino)
- 1916 "Ritratto a Richard Randal Davies" – Galleria d'Arte Moderna di Roma bought in 1926 in Mostra del Novecento.
- 1917 "Bambino coll’Uva
- Ritratto di Miss Dorothy Hayter"
- 1918 "Eva, Bronze
- 1919 "L'Idolo del Sarcasmo, Bronze
- La Cipria", Pietra Serena
- La Pescatrice der Stucken", Bronze – now in Sindacato Artisti, Roma
- 1920 "Il Bambino Negro
- 1921 "Donna Inglese allo Specchio
- "Medaglie della Guerra"
- Medaglia per la Duchessa d'Aosta (Helène d'Orleans)
- 1922 "Leda col Cigno
- Ritratto di Chiquita Esteban de Canongo", Bronze
- 1923 "Ritratto della Marchesa Ximenes de Aragon
- Medaglia di Cristoforo Colombo"
- Ritratto della Signora Giglioli"
- "Medaglia per i Volontari di Guerra" ordered by Gabriele d'Annunzio
- 1924 "La Pietà now in Casa Madre dei Mutilati di Roma
- "La Fumatrice"
- 1925 "Statua di Diana
- 1926 "La Bagnante – marble
- Fontana della Cariatidi" -used to be at the Savoia Hotel in Florence, now in a private collection.
- Pugile in Combattimento" – Opera Nazionale Dopolavoro, Rome, now dispersed.
- "Romolo che Traccia il Solco" -Ministry of Industry, Rome (ex Palazzo delle Corporazioni)
- 1927 "Ritratto di Luigi Guicciardini"
- La Gotica"
- Il Bagno del Bambino", Acquaforte published in "Il Selvaggio"
- "La Frangitura delle Olive", Drypoint
- 1928 Statua Equestre al General Botha
- Ritratto di Paolo Guicciardini"
- Torso"
- '1929 "Ritratto di Giovanni Papini" – Galleria d'Arte Moderna, Firenze
- "Ritratto di Domenico Giuliotti" – Galleria d'Arte Moderna, Roma
- 1930 "Ritratto di Ardengo Soffici" – Galleria d'Arte Moderna di Milano
- "Testa di Pugile Ferito" Museo Revoltella di Trieste & Private Collections
- Testa Colossale di Cavallo"
- Giano e la Vergine"
- Lo Scultore"
- Cristo" per il Monumento a Cadorna di Pallanza
- 1931 "Ritratto dello Scultore Grandi-Broneo
- Ritratto di Berta Betteloni"
- Gesu Bambino" – Galleria d'Arte Moderna di Novara
- "Ritratto di Fanciulla Etrusca" – Collezione Feroldi, Berscia. Now dispersed.
- "Ritratto di Fiamma Sergardi Biringucci" – Catalogued as being in the Galleria d'Arte Moderna di Firenze, but presently missing.
- 1932 Pugilatore Seduto
- Ritratto di del Duca Amedeo d'Aosta – Civica Galleria d'Arte Moderna di Torino
- 1933 Ritratto della Baronessa Fiamma Sergardi
- Medaglia del Duca degli Abruzzi
- 1934 "Ritratto di Alessandra Morpugo
- 1935 "Ritratto di Eugenio Niccolini
- 1936 "Tomba della Famiglia Ruiz Panama
- "Ritratto Duca degli Abruzzi" – Italian Senate, Accademia Navale di Livorno (cit. "was removed by the British forces"), Private Collection
- 1937 "Statua di Mussolini in Piedi
- Tomba Fiaschi Melbourne"
- 1938 Monumento Equestre a Giorgio Castriota Skanderbeg, Bronze
- Tomba del Duca degli Abruzzi", Somalia
- 1939 Monumento al Legionario, Addis Adeba.

== Exhibitions ==
- 1910 Biennale di Venezia – "Ercole e il Leone"
- 1911 Esposizione Universale di Roma – "Ercole e il Leone"
- 1926 Mostra del Novecento Italiano -"Ritratto di Richard Randal Davies"
- 2003-Mart Rovereto "Scultura Linga Morta. Scultura nell'Italia Fascista" Promoted by the Henry Moore Foundation
