= Soffici =

Soffici is a surname. Notable people with the surname include:

- Ardengo Soffici (1879–1964), Italian writer, painter, poet, sculptor and intellectual
- Filippo Soffici (born 1970), Italian rower
- Juan Soffici, Argentine film editor
- Mario Soffici (1900–1977), Italian-born Argentine film director, actor and screenwriter
- Piero Soffici (1920–2004) Italian composer and conductor
- Roberto Soffici (born 1946), Italian singer-songwriter, composer and lyricist
