= Hercules Strangling the Nemean Lion (Romanelli) =

- Italian: Ercole che strozza il leone nemeo
- Artist: Romano Romanelli
- Year: 1935
- Medium: Bronze
- Subject: Hercules, Nemean lion
- Location: Florence
- 43°46′20″N 11°14′44″E

Hercules Strangling the Nemean Lion is a bronze sculpture located in the Piazza Ognissanti, overlooking the River Arno in Florence, Italy.

== History and description ==
The first bronze statuettes on this subject were completed and exhibited by the Florentine sculptor Romano Romanelli in 1906–1910. Romanelli became a prominent sculptor for the Fascist administration of Benito Mussolini. In 1930, the Fascist authorities removed the statue of the Venetian-Italian patriot Daniele Manin from the center of this piazza, where it had been placed, and installed it in the suburbs of Arcetri. In its place, the Jewish-Italian patron Angiolo Orvieto commissioned this sculpture, placed here in 1937 after display at the exhibition of the Quadriennale d'Arte Nazionale in Rome. A casting of this sculpture was also exhibited in Berlin in 1937, where it was prominently placed at the entrance of the exhibition alongside a photograph of Mussolini and King Victor Emmanuel III.
