= Edinburgh Painter =

Unidentified ancient Greek vase painter

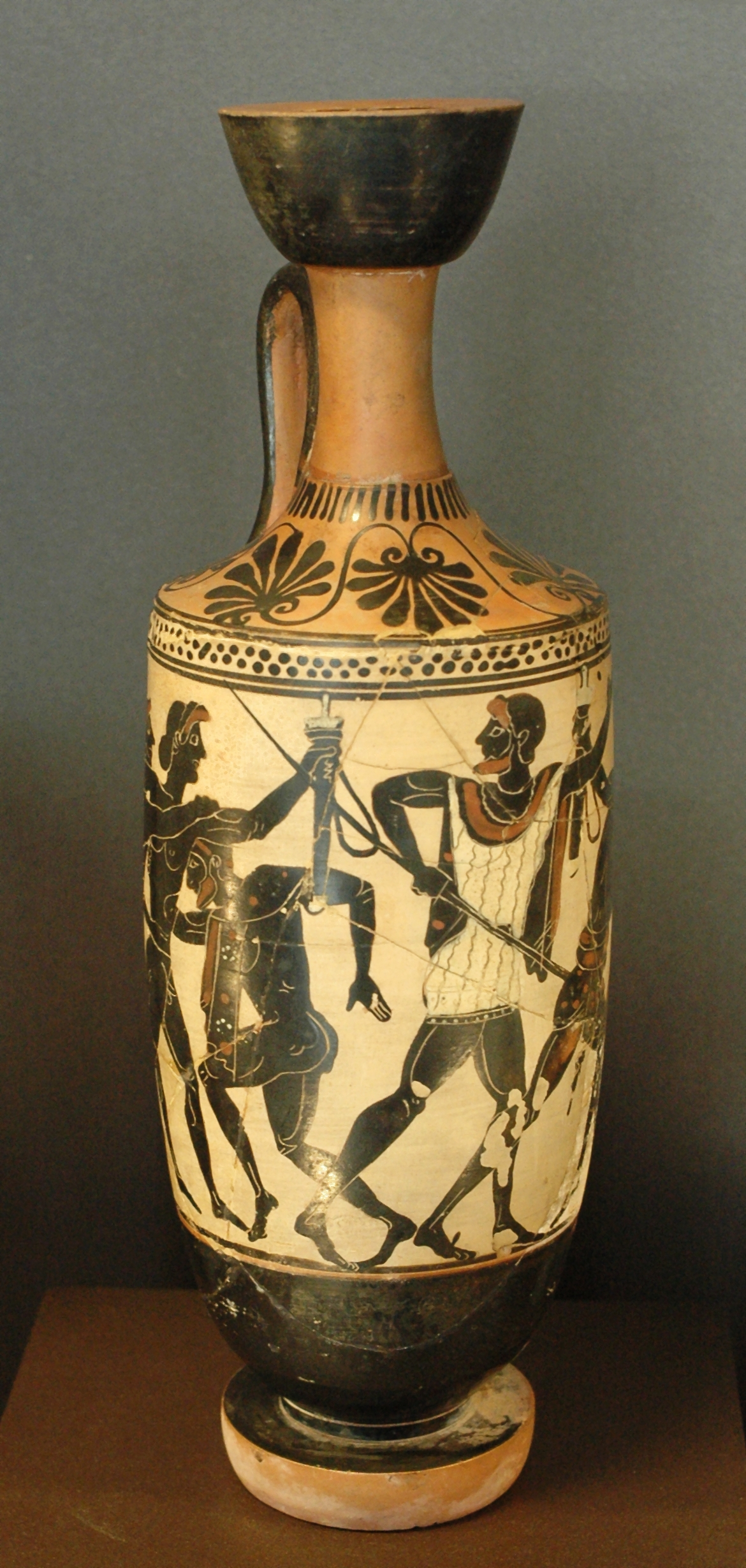
- Possibly Aias Telamonios and Odysseus fighting over Achilles' weapons, painting by the Edinburgh Painter. White-ground Attic lekythos, c. 500 BC, from Eretria.
- Born: Unknown. Named from one of his vases in the Edinburgh Museum. Before 545 BC; Probably Athens
- Known for: Vase painting
- Movement: Black-figure style

The Edinburgh Painter was an Attic black-figure vase painter, active around 500 BC. His speciality was white-ground lekythoi painted in the black-figure style.

His real name is unknown. His conventional name is derived from his name vase in Edinburgh, National Museum of Scotland 1956.436.

== Gallery ==
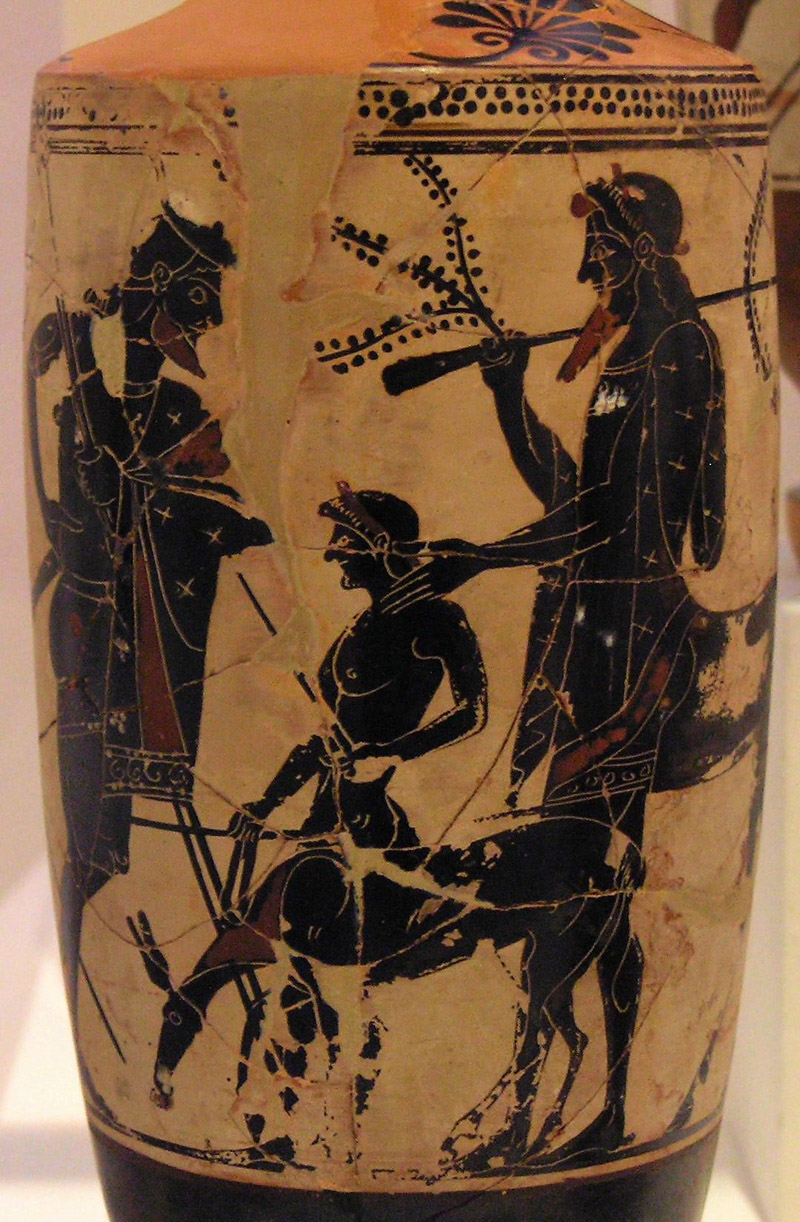
Lekythos, Peleas, Achilles and Cheiron, Athens, National Museum 550

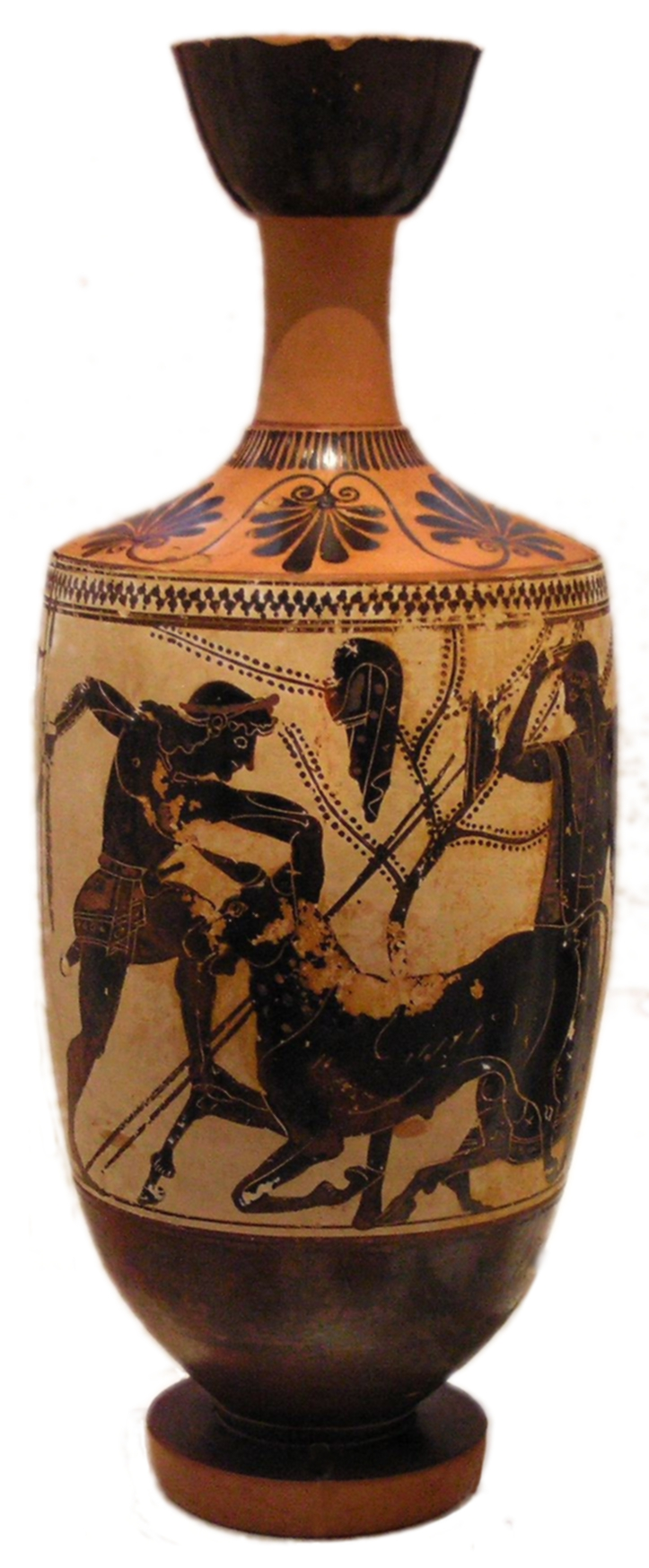
Lekythos, Theseus and the bull, Athens, National Museum 1124

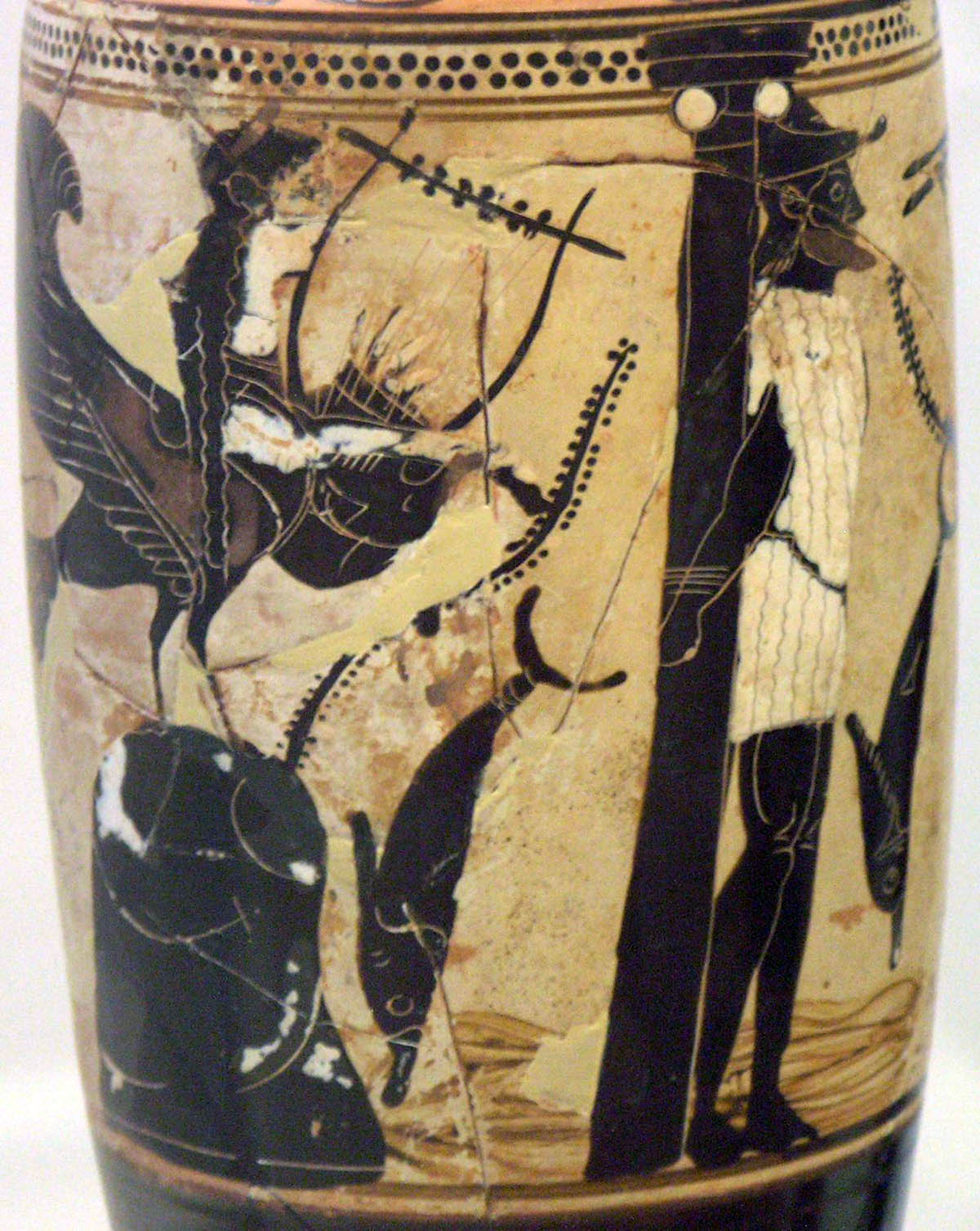
Lekythos, Odysseus and a siren, Athens, National Museum 1130

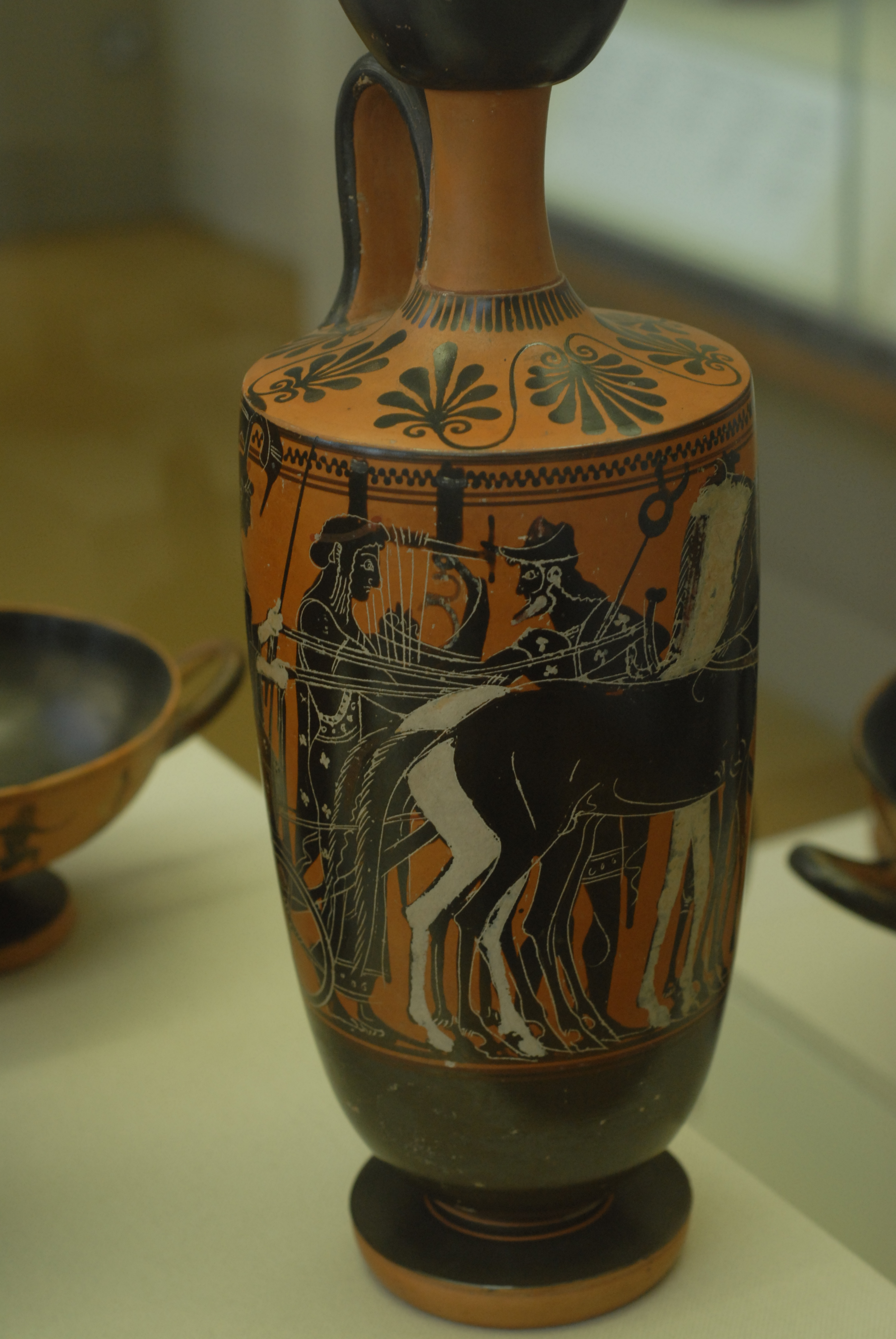
Name vase, Edinburgh, National Museums of Scotland MoS 1872.23.12

== Bibliography ==
- C. H. Emilie Haspels: Attic black-figured lekythoi, Paris 1936, p. 86-89. 215-221.
- John Beazley: Attic Black-Figure Vase-Painters, Oxford 1956, p. 476-480.
- John Boardman: Schwarzfigurige Vasen aus Athen. Ein Handbuch, Mainz 1977, ISBN 3-8053-0233-9, p. 159.
- Thomas Mannack: Haspels addenda: additional references to C. H. E. Haspels Attic black-figured Lekythoi. Oxford 2006. ISBN 0-19-726315-1, p.
