= Hercules Fighting the Nemean Lion (Zurbarán) =

Painting by Francisco de Zurbarán

- Spanish: Hércules lucha con el león de Nemea
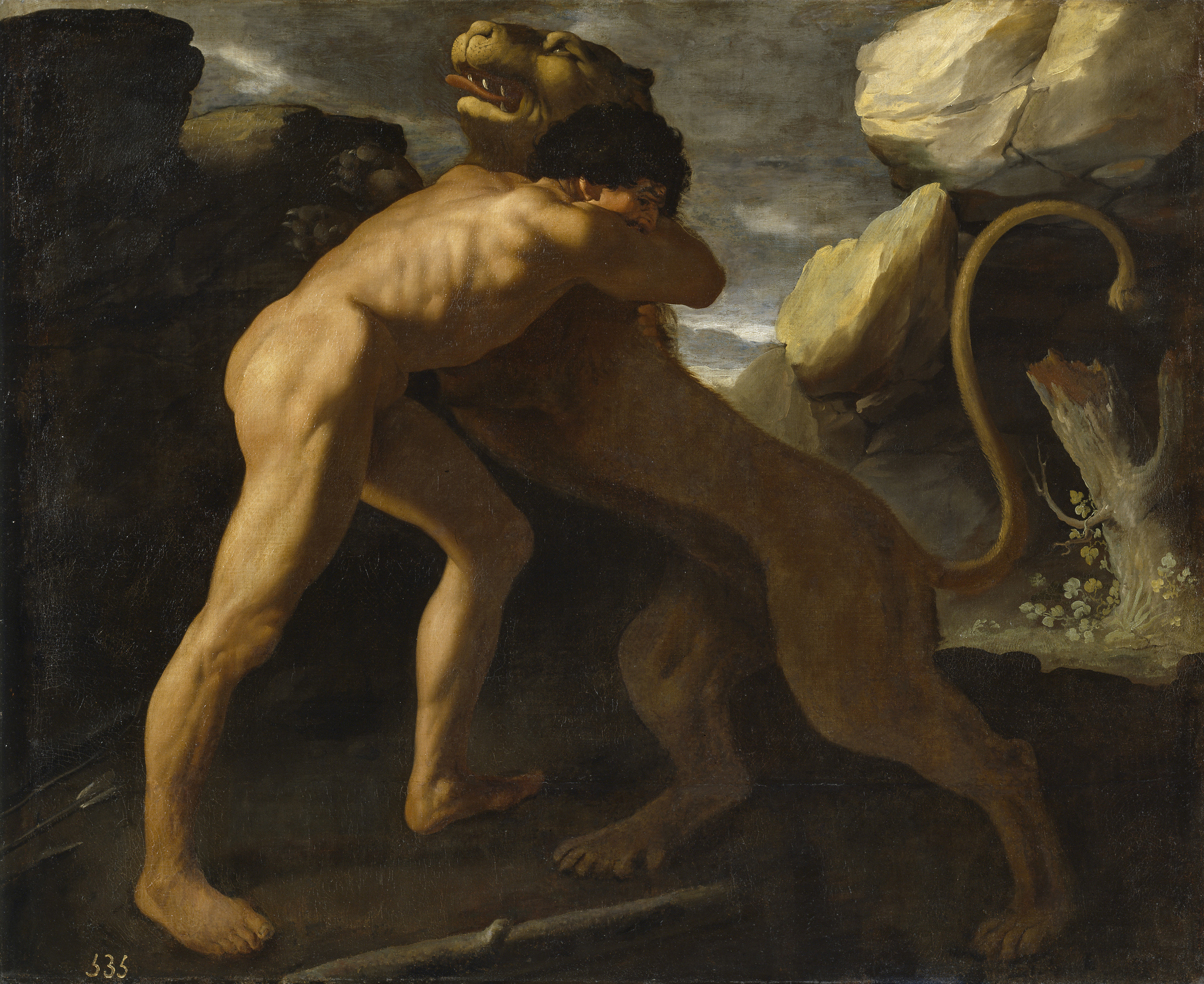
- Artist: Francisco de Zurbarán
- Completion date: 1634
- Dimensions: 151 × 166 cm
- Location: Museo del Prado

Hercules Fighting the Nemean Lion is a work of 1634 by the Spanish painter Francisco de Zurbarán. It is conserved in the Museo del Prado.

== Description ==
The painting depicts Heracles fighting the Nemean Lion. The Spanish art critic Soria suggests a comparison with a woodcut fashioned by Cornelis Cort after a work by Frans Floris, based on the hero's position. The rocky setting was designed according to a woodcut by Barthel Beham: Fighting versus Centaur (1542).

It is one of series of 10 artworks on the Labours of Hercules commissioned by Philip IV of Spain for the decoration of the Hall of Realms in the Buen Retiro Palace. The series is now on display at the Museo del Prado.

== Bibliography ==
- Juan Antonio Gaya Nuño and Tiziana Frati, La obra Pictórica de Zurbarán, Editorial Planeta, Barcelona, 1988, ISBN 84-320-2866-5 pp. 131–132.
