= C. H. E. Haspels =

Dutch classical archaeologist

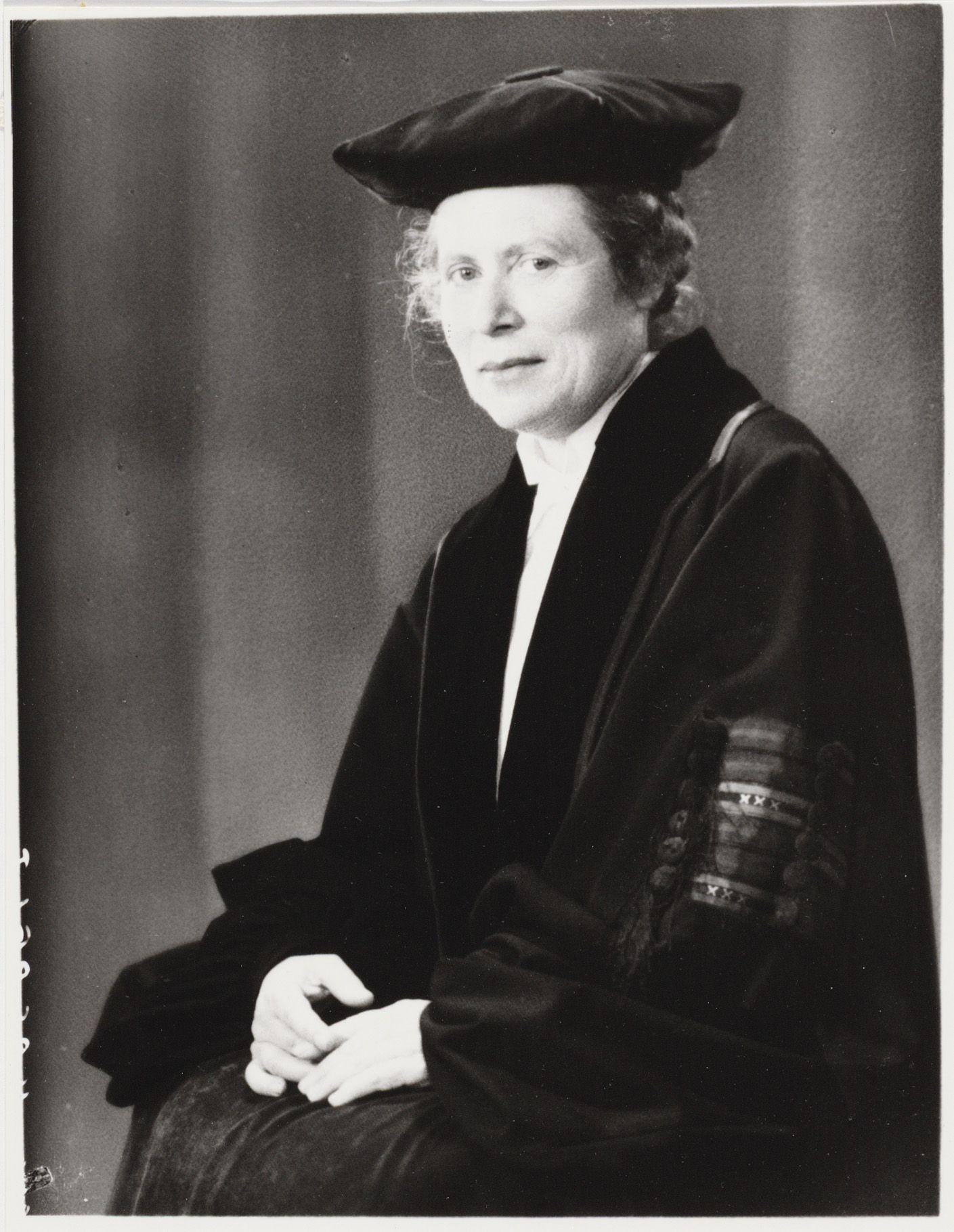
Emilie Haspels (1948)

Caroline Henriette Emilie Haspels (15 September 1894, Colmschate – 25 December 1980, Capelle aan den IJssel) was a Dutch classical archaeologist.

== Life ==
Emilie Haspels was the daughter of George Frans Haspels. Her 1936 book Attic Black Figured-Lekythoi, based on her work at the University of Utrecht, has remained the standard on lekythoi since its publication. Haspels was the first to attribute the black-figured lekythoi produced in Athens between ca. 560 and 470 B.C., mostly for graves, to specific painters and workshops.

From 1937 to 1939, she worked on the excavation of the Midas City in Yazılıkaya, Eskişehir. Surprised by the outbreak of war, she could not return to Europe and remained in Istanbul, where she taught at the University of Istanbul. From 1946 to 1965, she was Professor of Classical Archaeology at the University of Amsterdam. In 1960 she became member of the Royal Netherlands Academy of Arts and Sciences.

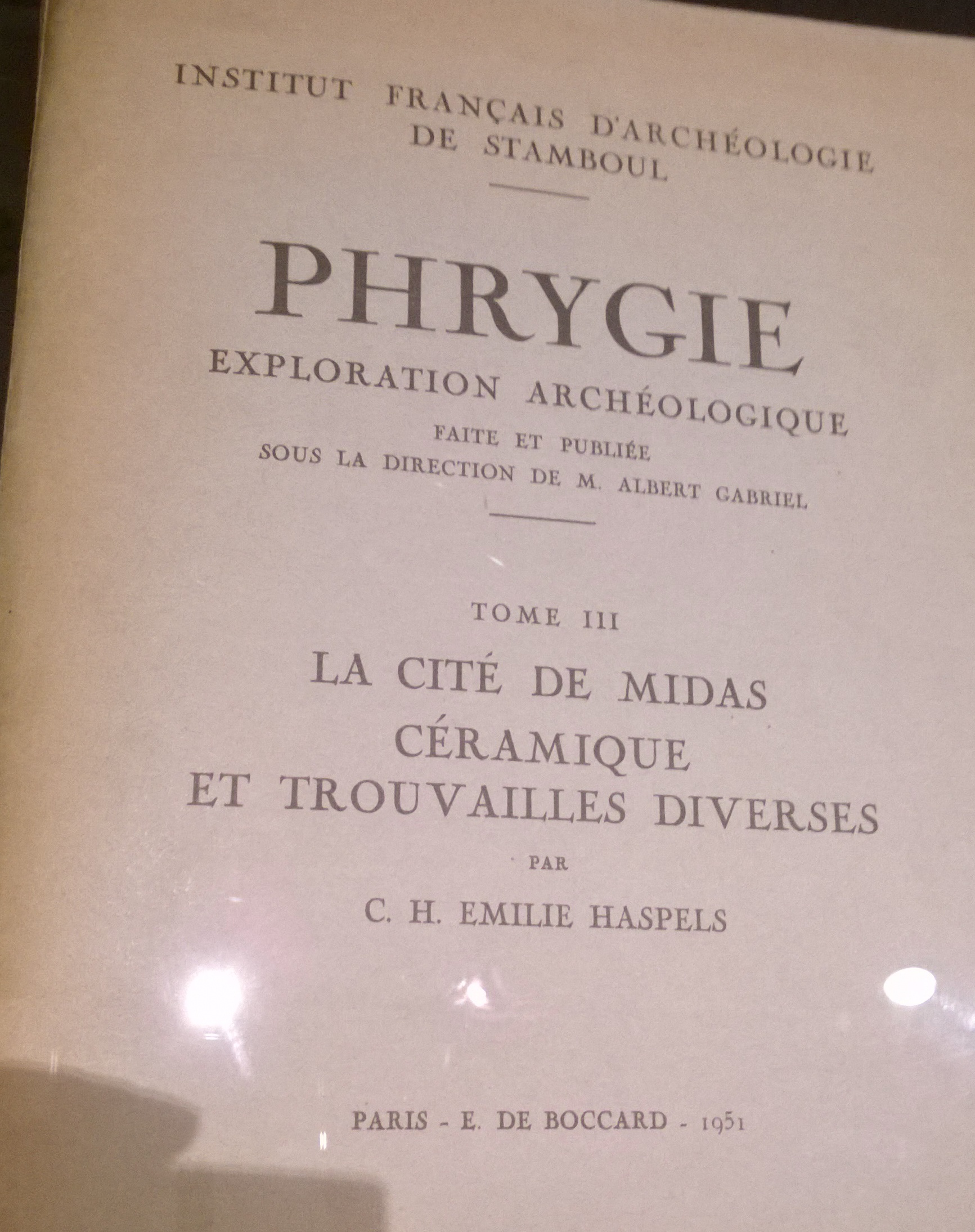
La cité de Midas : céramique et trouvailles diverses, Paris 1951

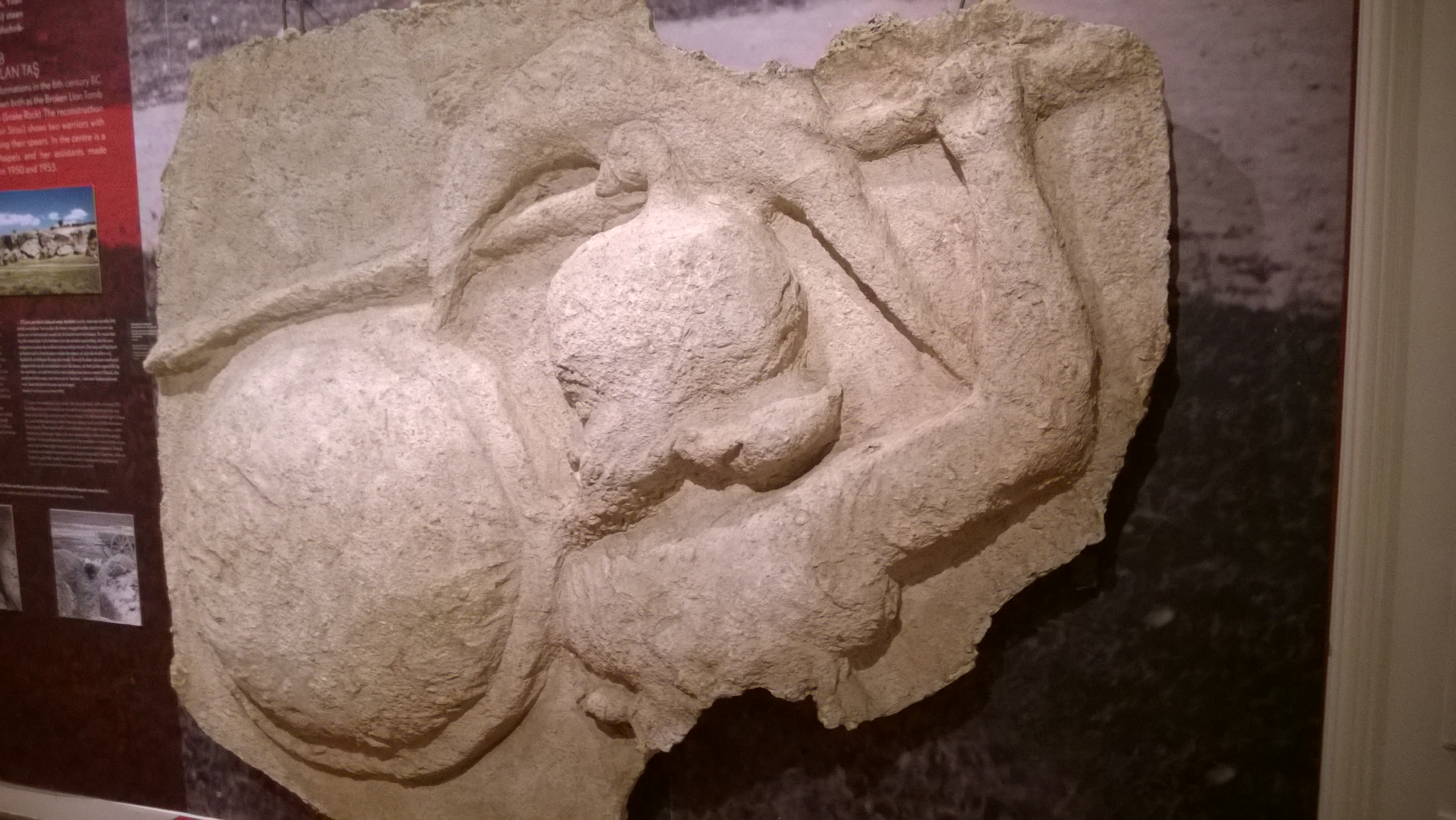
She created many plaster casts that were sent back to Amsterdam and are in the collection of the Allard Pierson Museum

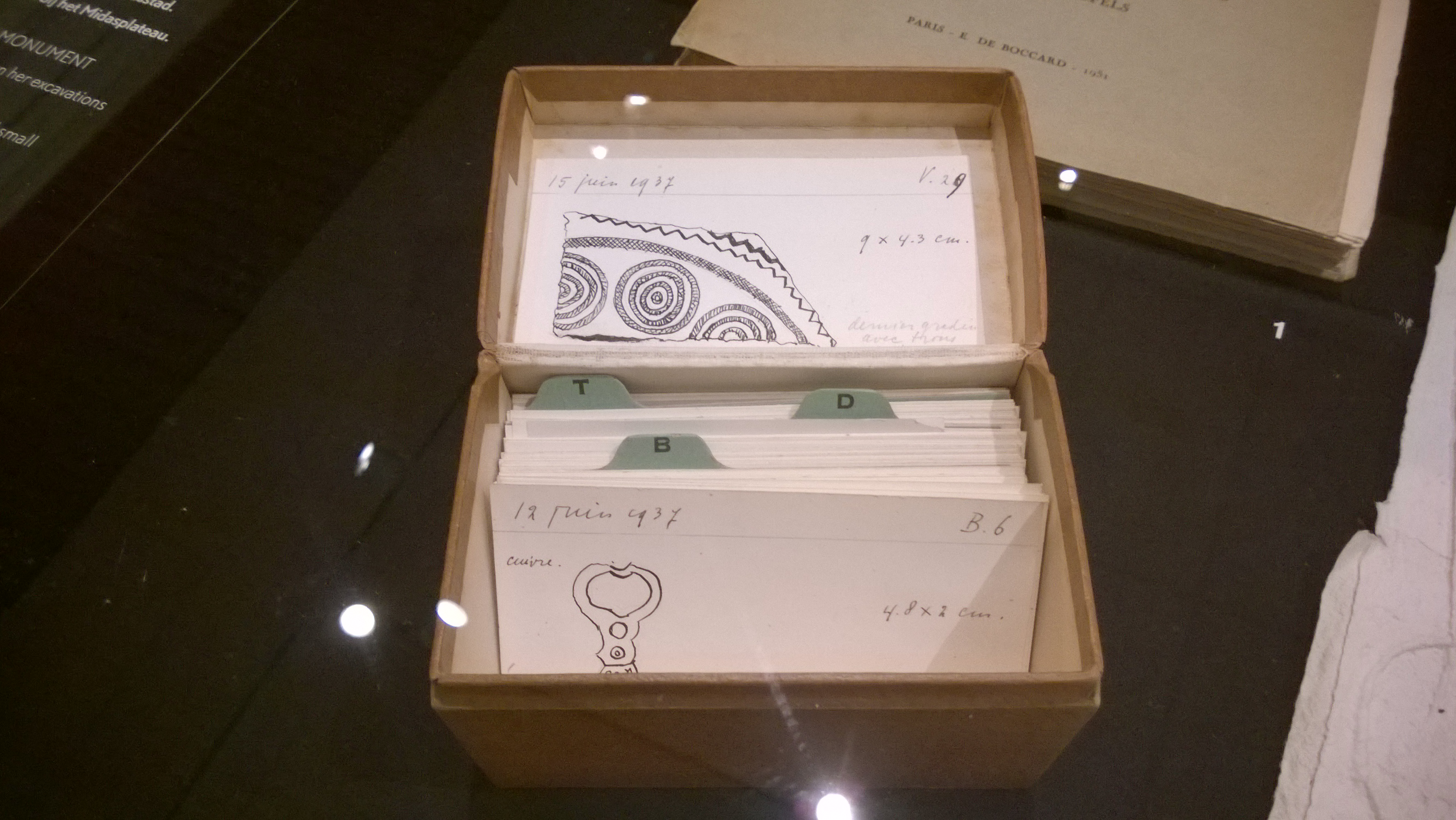
Her index card file of markings at Midas City

== Publications ==
- Attic black-figured lekythoi, Paris, 1936.
- La cité de Midas : céramique et trouvailles diverses, Paris 1951
- The highlands of Phrygia : sites and monuments, 2 vols, Princeton 1971
- A Misleading Lekythos in the Villa Giulia Museum (Talanta, 1973)
- I am the last of the travelers : Midas city excavations and surveys in the highlands of Phrygia, ed. Dietrich Berndt; contributions by Halet Çambel. İstanbul, Arkeoloji ve Sanat Yayınları, 2009.
