= List of Greek vase painters =

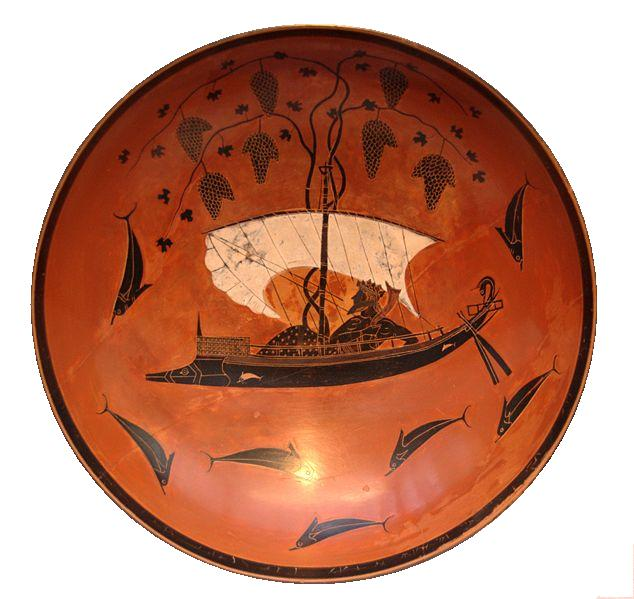
Interior of the Dionysus cup, by Exekias

The following is a list of ancient Greek vase painters who have been identified either by name or by style. Because of the research of academics like John Davidson Beazley, Arthur Dale Trendall, Robert Manuel Cook, Darrell A. Amyx and Conrad Stibbe more than 2800 individual painters are known.

== Geometric period ==
- Anavysos Painter
- Painter of Athens 877
- Painter of Athens 894
- Birdseed Painter
- Burly Painter
- Cesnola Painter
- Dipylon Master
- Empedocles Painter
- Hirschfeld Painter
- Philadelphia Painter
- Stathatou Painter
- Vulture Painter

== Orientalizing period ==
- Aigina Bellerophon Painter
- Altenburg Painter
- Analatos Painter
- Chigi Painter
- Head-in-Air Painter
- Honolulu Painter
- Hound Painter
- Mesogeia Painter
- Passas Painter
- Polyphemos Painter
- Ram Jug Painter

== Black-figure period ==
Individual painters include:

- Acheloos Painter
- Achradina Painter
- Painter of Acropolis 606
- Affecter
- Painter of Agora P 1241
- Allard-Pierson Painter
- Amasis Painter
- Ampersand Painter
- Anagyrus Painter
- Anakles
- Ano Achaïia Painter
- Andokides Painter
- Antimenes Painter
- Arkesilas Painter
- Athena Painter
- Beldam Painter
- Bellerophon Painter
- Painter of Berlin A 34
- Painter of Berlin F 1090
- Painter of Berlin 1686
- BMN Painter
- Boreads Painter
- Bucci Painter
- C Painter
- Cavalcade Painter
- Castellani Painter
- Centaur Painter
- Centauren Painter
- Cerameicus Painter
- Chimaira Painter
- Chimera Painter
- Chiusi Painter
- Columbus Painter
- Daybreak Painter
- Diosphos Painter
- Dodwell Painter
- Dorow Painter
- Duel Painter
- Eagle Painter
- Edinburgh Painter
- Elbows Out
- Ergoteles
- Eucharides Painter
- Euphiletos Painter
- Exekias
- Feoli Painter
- Geledakis Painter
- Gela Painter
- Goltyr Painter
- Gorgon Painter
- Griffin-Bird Painter
- Guglielmi Painter
- Haimon Painter
- Heidelberg Painter
- Hippolytos Painter
- Horse-bird Painter
- Hunt Painter
- Kabeiros Painter
- Karithaios Painter
- Kassandra Painter
- Kleitias
- KX Painter
- KY Painter
- Lion Painter
- Lydos
- Lysippides Painter
- Madrid Painter
- Mastos Painter
- Memnon Painter
- Micali Painter
- Michigan Painter
- Painter of Munich 237
- Painter of Munich 1410
- Mystai Painter
- N Painter
- Naucratis Painter
- Neandros Painter
- Nearchos
- Nessos Painter
- Painter of Nicosia Olpe
- Nikosthenes
- Nikoxenos Painter
- Oakeshott Painter
- Oltos
- Ophelandros Painter
- Otterlo Painter
- Painter of Palermo 489
- Painter of the Palermo Gorgoneion
- Panther Painter
- Paseas
- Pasikles Painter
- Phineus Painter
- Pholoe Painter
- Phrynos Painter
- Piraeus Painter
- Polos Painter
- Priam Painter
- Princeton Painter
- Prometheus Painter
- Psiax
- Ptoon Painter
- Red-Black Painter
- Red-Line Painter
- Painter of Rhodes 13472
- Ribbon Painter
- Rider Painter
- Rycroft Painter
- Sakonides
- Sappho Painter
- Silenus Painter
- Sokles Painter
- Sophilos
- Sphinx Painter
- Swing Painter
- Taleides Painter
- Taranto Painter
- Taras Painter
- Painter of Tarquinia RC 6847
- Teisias the Athenian
- Theseus Painter
- Three Sirens Painter
- Timiades Painter
- Tityos Painter
- Tleson Painter
- Tokra Painter
- Tydeus Painter
- Typhon Painter
- Painter of Vatican G 62
- Painter of Vatican 73
- Painter of the Vatican Mourner
- Xenokles Painter
- Zürich Painter

Groups and classes of painters include:

- Boeotian Dancer Group
- Burgon Group
- Class of Cabinet des Médailles 218
- Chimaira Group
- Comast Group
- Group E
- Gorgoneion Group
- Hypobibazon Class
- Kabiria Group
- Leagros Group
- Little Masters
  - Charon Group
  - Golvol Group
  - Group of Louvre F 81
  - Group of Rhodes 12264
  - Group of Toronto 289
  - Group of Vatican G 61
  - Group of Villa Giulia 3559
- Northampton Group
- Oxford Palmette Class
- Perizoma Group
- Pontic Group
- Ragusa Group
- Three Line Group

== Red-figure period ==
=== Archaic period ===
Individual painters include:

- Achilles Painter
- Andokides Painter
- Apollodoros
- Berlin Painter
- Brygos Painter
- Bryn Mawr Painter
- Dokimasia Painter
- Douris
- Epiktetos
- Eucharides Painter
- Euphronios
- Euthymides
- Foundry Painter
- Harrow Painter
- Hermonax
- Kleophrades Painter
- Makron
- Nikoxenos Painter
- Onesimos
- Pan Painter
- Pheidippos
- Phintias
- Providence Painter
- Psiax
- Sabouroff Painter
- Siren Painter
- Skythes
- Smikros
- Tithonos Painter
- Triptolemos Painter

Groups and classes of painters include:

- Pioneer Group

=== Classical period ===
Individual painters include:

- Academy Painter
- Achilles Painter
- Agrigento Painter
- Aison
- Altamura Painter
- Antiphon Painter
- Aristophanes
- Painter of Athens 1183
- Painter of the Athens Argos Cup
- Painter of Berlin Hydria
- Bird Painter
- Blenheim Painter
- Bowdoin Painter
- Briseis Painter
- Chrysis Painter
- Clio Painter
- Codrus Painter
- Dinos Painter
- Dwarf Painter
- Eretria Painter
- Geneva Painter
- Painter of the Great Athens Kantharos
- Hasselmann Painter
- Hephaistos Painter
- Jena Painter
- Painter of the Judgement of Paris
- Kleophon Painter
- Leningrad Painter
- Loeb Painter
- Painter of London
- Painter of London D 12
- Lyandros Painter
- Lykaon Painter
- Marlay Painter
- Meidias Painter
- Meleager Painter
- Painter of Munich 2335
- Myson
- Nausikaa Painter
- Niobid Painter
- Oreithyia painter
- Pan Painter
- Penthesilea Painter
- Persephone Painter
- Phiale Painter
- Pig Painter
- Pistoxenos Painter
- Polygnotos
- Providence Painter
- Reed Painter
- Sabouroff Painter
- Tarquinia Painter
- Telos Painter
- Thanatos Painter
- Timokrates Painter
- Triglyph Painter
- Tymbos Painter
- Tyszkiewicz Painter
- Villa Giulia Painter
- Washing Painter
- Wedding Painter
- Westreenen Painter

Groups and classes of painters include:

- Kerch style
- Mannerists
  - Nausikaa-Hephaistos Group
- YZ Group

=== South Italian and Sicilian red-figure vase painters ===
- Amykos Painter
- Asteas
- Baltimore Painter
- Painter of the Berlin Dancing Girl
- Painter of the Boston Orestes
- Carnea Painter
- Cyclops Painter
- Darius Painter
- Ilioupersis Painter
- Lipari Painter
- Marsyas Painter
- Painter of Naples 2074
- Pisticci Painter
- Policoro Painter
- Python
- Shuvalov Painter
- Sisyphus Painter
- Snub-nose Painter
- Tarporley Painter
- Underworld Painter
- Varrese Painter

== See also ==
- Art in ancient Greece
- Black-figure pottery
- Geometric art
- Greek terracotta figurines
- Minoan pottery
- National Archaeological Museum of Athens
- Pottery of ancient Greece
- Red-figure pottery

== Sources ==
- Paolo Enrico Arias, Max Hirmer, and B. B. Shefton. A History of Greek Vase Painting. London: Thames and Hudson Publishing, 1962.
- Robert Manuel Cook. Greek Painted Pottery. London: Methuen Publishing, 1972.
- Tom Rasmussen and Nigel Jonathan Spivey. Looking at Greek Vases. Cambridge [England], New York: Cambridge University Press, 1991.
