= Chimera Painter =

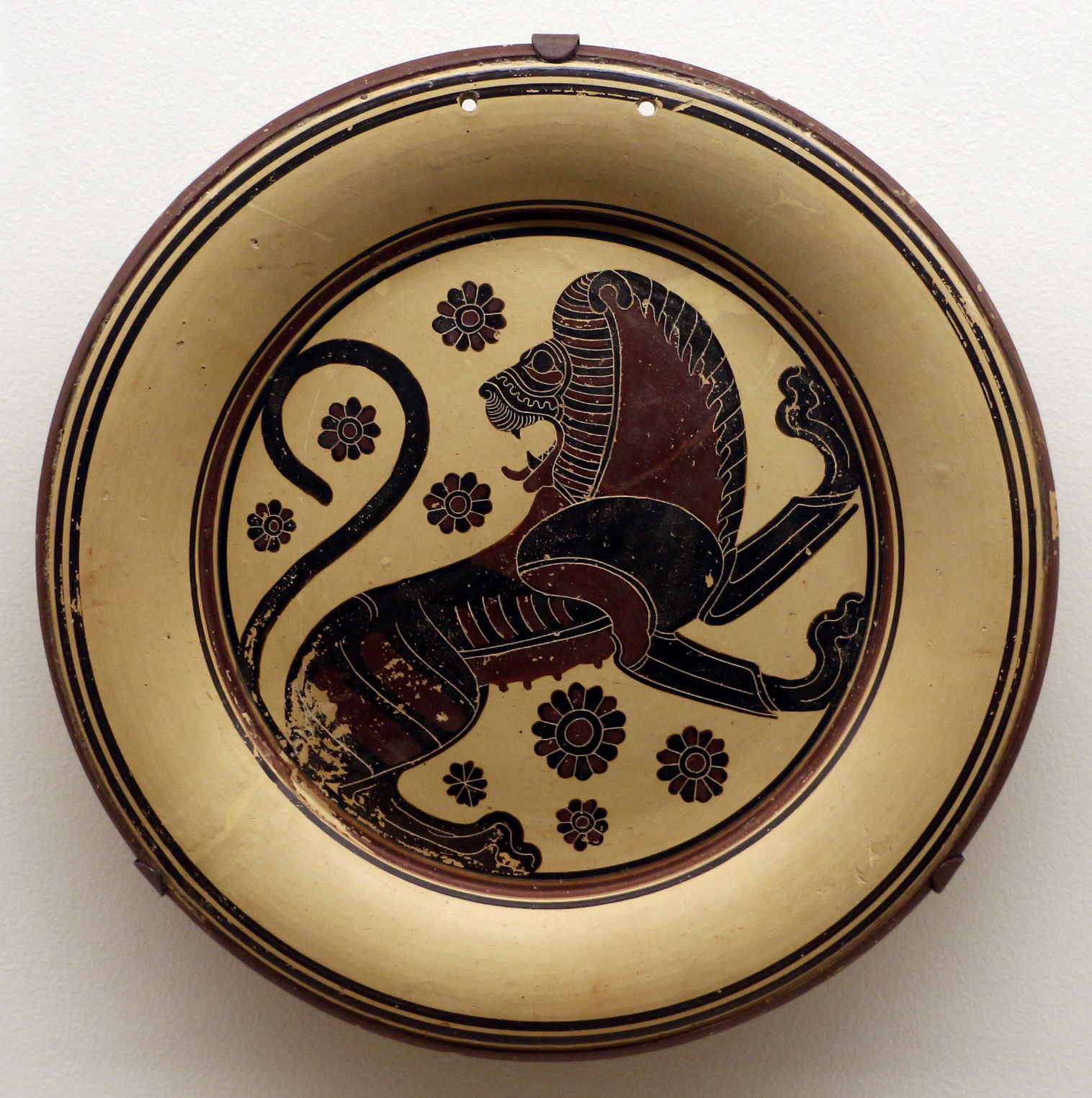
Plate with Seated Lioness (c. 580 BC) Cincinnati Art Museum

The Chimera Painter (also spelled Chimaera Painter) was an anonymous Corinthian black figure vase painter active c. 600–575 BC. He is named for the Chimera depicted on one of his works, which is now in Vienna. The artist was likely a student of the Columbus Painter, who in turn was a student of the Painter of Palermo 489. His work displays strong Near Eastern influence; the influence of Assyrian art is particularly visible in his depictions of lions.
