= Dodwell Painter =

Ancient Corinthian vase painter

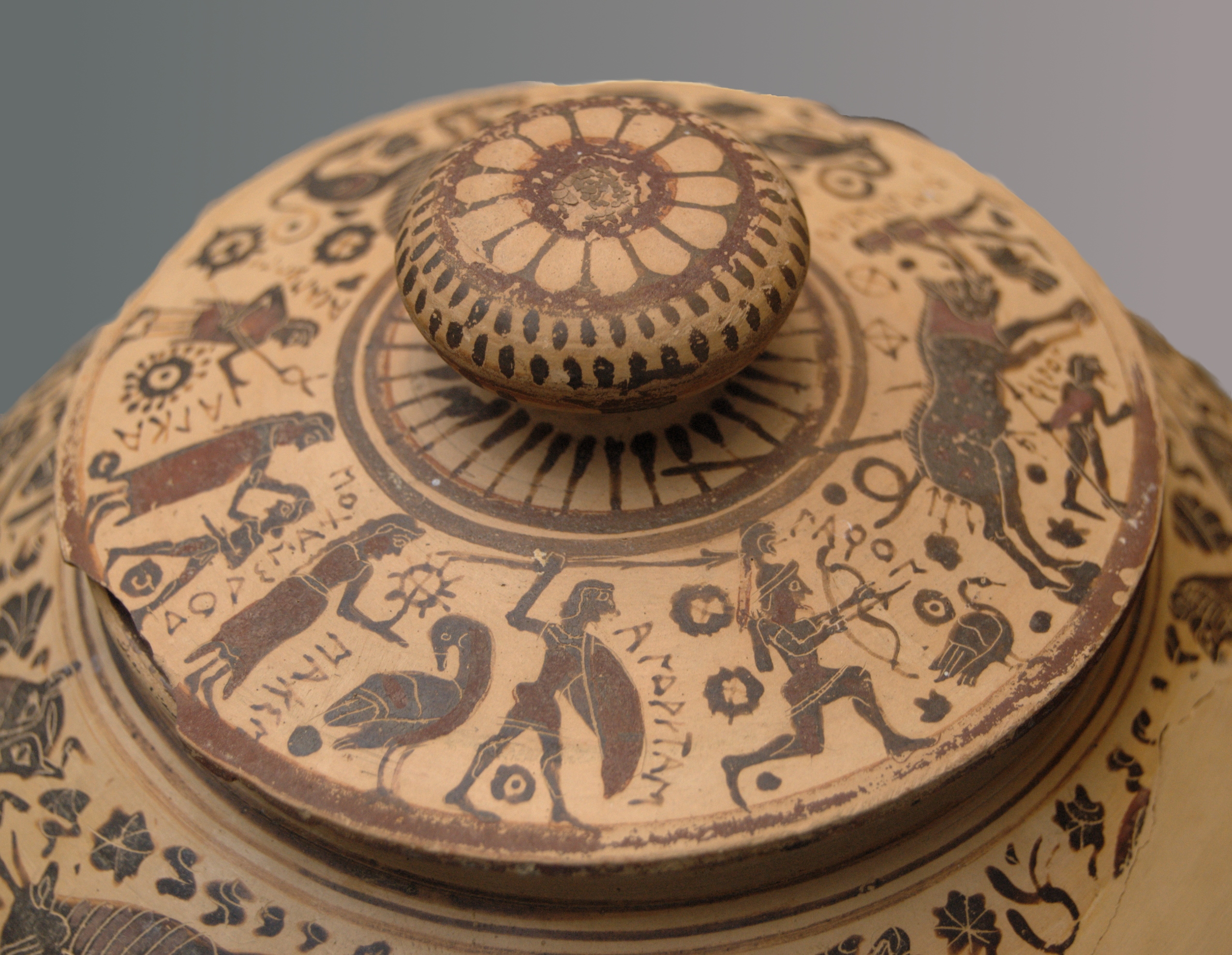
Lid of the Dodwell Pyxis

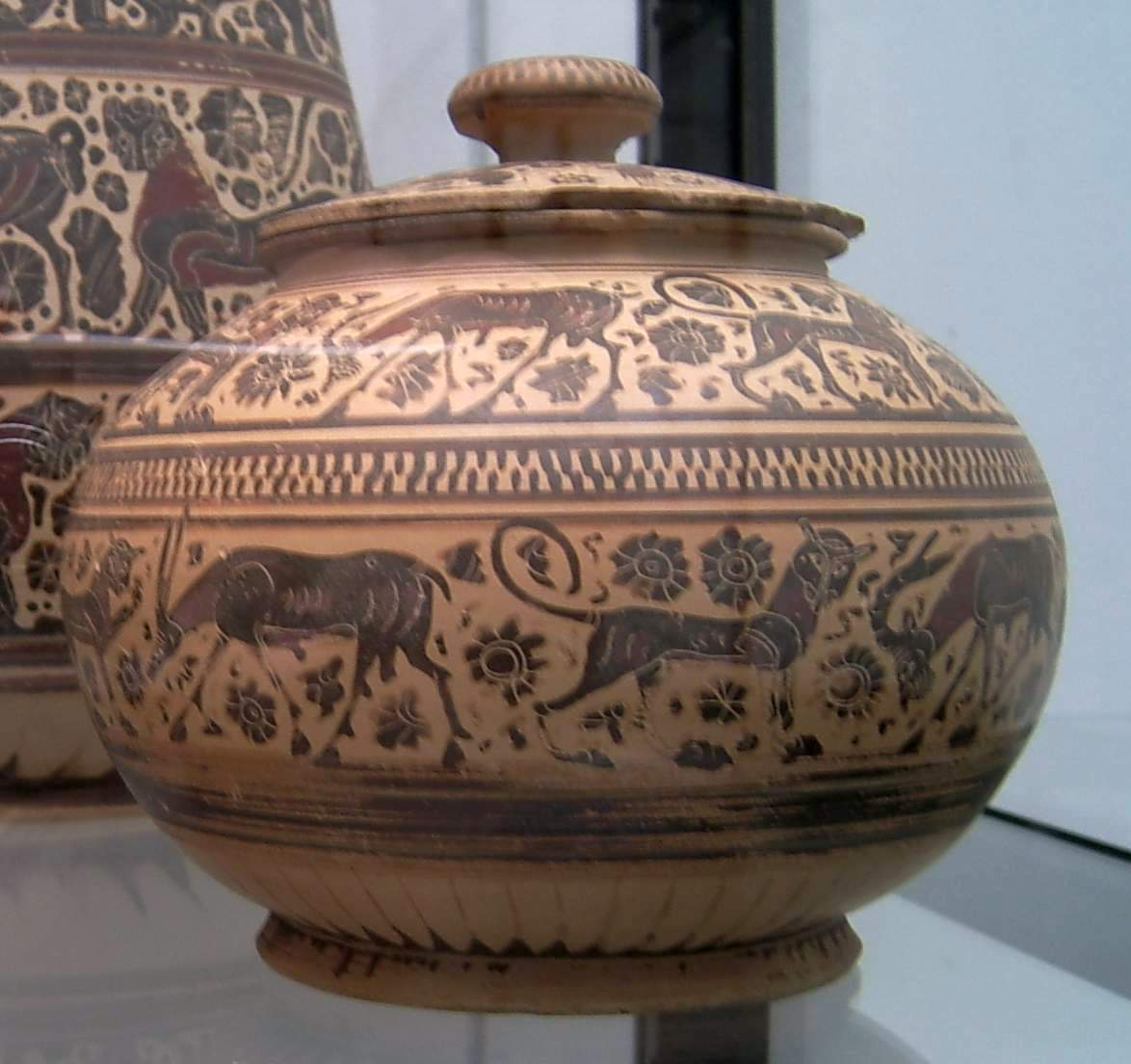
Dodwell Pyxis

Dodwell Painter was an ancient Corinthian vase painter in the black-figure style whose real name is rather unknown. He was active during the Middle and Late Corinthian periods (c. 600–550 BC) and his works dates back to 580 to 570 BC.

The Dodwell Painter was one of the most important Corinthian vase painters of his time. He decorated mainly pyxides and oinochoai, but also neck amphorae and hydriai. He painted most of his vases with friezes of animals or horsemen. Of exceptional importance is a pyxis in the Staatliche Antikensammlungen at Munich known as the Dodwell Pyxis. On the lid, it depicts the hunt for the Calydonian Boar as well as several other figures from Greek mythology not related to that motif, including Agamemnon. The figures are named by added inscriptions, not all of which appear appropriate to the figures they accompany. Another important piece is at the Villa Giulia in Rome. The olpe depicts a frieze with several komasts dancing around a krater; a second frieze shows Herakles fighting the Hydra. Usually his paintings show much routine, but lack precision. About 70 vases are ascribed to him and according to Darrell A. Amyx, another ten painters can be described as his circle. They, too, mainly painted pyxides and oinochoai with animal friezes. Additionally, several successors were influenced by Dodwell Painter.

== Bibliography ==
- Thomas Mannack: Griechische Vasenmalerei. Eine Einführung. Theiss, Stuttgart 2002, p. 101 ISBN 3-8062-1743-2.
