= Beldam =

Beldam may refer to:

== People ==
- The Beldam Painter (active circa 470 to before 450 BC), Greek black-figure vase painter
- George Beldam (1868–1937), English cricketer and photographer
- George Beldam, alias Rex Bell (1903–1962), American actor and politician
- Joseph Beldam (1795–1866), English writer, historian and advocate of the abolition of slavery

== Fictional characters ==
- The Beldam, the main antagonist of Neil Gaiman's dark fantasy novella Coraline and its subsequent film adaptation
- Beldam (Paper Mario), one of the Shadow Sirens in Paper Mario: The Thousand-Year Door

== See also ==
- Beldame (1901–1924), an American racehorse and broodmare
- La Belle Dame sans Merci, a ballad by English poet John Keats
