= Tydeus Painter =

Ancient Greek vase painter

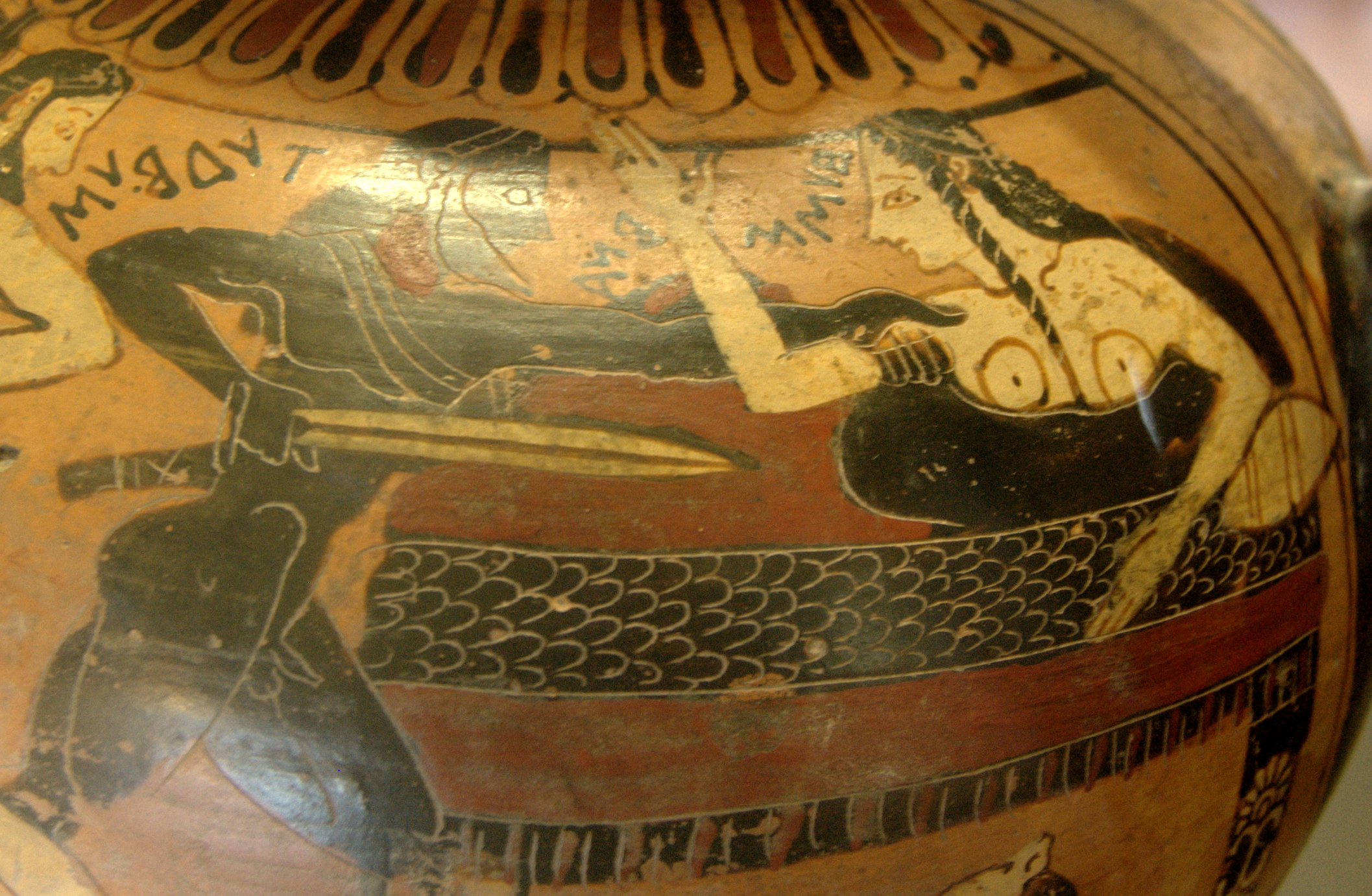
Name vase: Tydeus slays Ismene.

The Tydeus Painter was an ancient Greek vase painter working in the Corinthian black-figure style. His real name is unknown. He was active during the Late Corinthian phase (ca. 575 to 550 BC); his works are dated to about 560 BC.

The Tydeus Painter was one of the most important and probably the last significant vase painter of the late phase of the black-figure in Corinth. He mainly painted amphorae, kraters, lekythoi and oinochoai. His most important works are on red-ground neck amphorae; they include a depiction of the killing of the nude Ismene by Tydeus on his name vase, which is now on display in the Louvre. On a second amphora, also in Paris he painted the fight between Theseus and the Minotaur. Otherwise, he painted no scenes from Greek mythology, but preferred battle scenes and komasts, as well as animals and hybrid creatures. Striking feature of his works is the copious use of white and red paints, as well as the many inscriptions naming his figures. His work can so far not be distinguished from that of related artists with complete certainty.

== See also ==
- List of Greek vase painters

== Bibliography ==
- Thomas Mannack: Griechische Vasenmalerei. Eine Einführung. Theiss, Stuttgart 2002, p. 103 ISBN 3-8062-1743-2.
