= Shambling Bull Painter =

The Shambling Bull Painter was an ancient Corinthian vase painter in the black-figure style; his real name is unknown. He was active during the transitional period between orientalising vase painting and black-figure proper (ca. 640–625 BC). He painted especially ‘’aryballoi’’; the most famous showing a hunting scene.

== Bibliography ==
- Thomas Mannack: Griechische Vasenmalerei. Eine Einführung. Theiss, Stuttgart 2002, p. 101 ISBN 3-8062-1743-2.
