= Bellerophon Painter =

Unidentified ancient Greek vase painter

The Bellerophon Painter was one of the first Attic black-figure vase painters. His period of activity is dated between 630 and 600 BC.

He was a contemporary of the Nessos Painter, whose importance and artistic class he did not reach. His known works are two neck amphora, one depicting Bellerophon, the other a chimera. Both were found at Vari and are now in the National Archaeological Museum at Athens (Inv. 16389 and 16391). A striking feature of his and his contemporaries’ works is the habit of filling the painted areas with many figures and ornaments that only be distinguished with difficulty.

== See also ==
- List of Greek vase painters

== Bibliography ==
- John D. Beazley: Attic Black-figure Vase-painters. Oxford, 1956, p. 2.
- John Boardman: Schwarzfigurige Vasen aus Athen. Ein Handbuch, von Zabern, 4th ed. Mainz, 1994 (Kulturgeschichte der Antiken Welt, Band 1.) ISBN 3-8053-0233-9, p. 18.
