= Piraeus Painter =

Ancient Greek vase painter

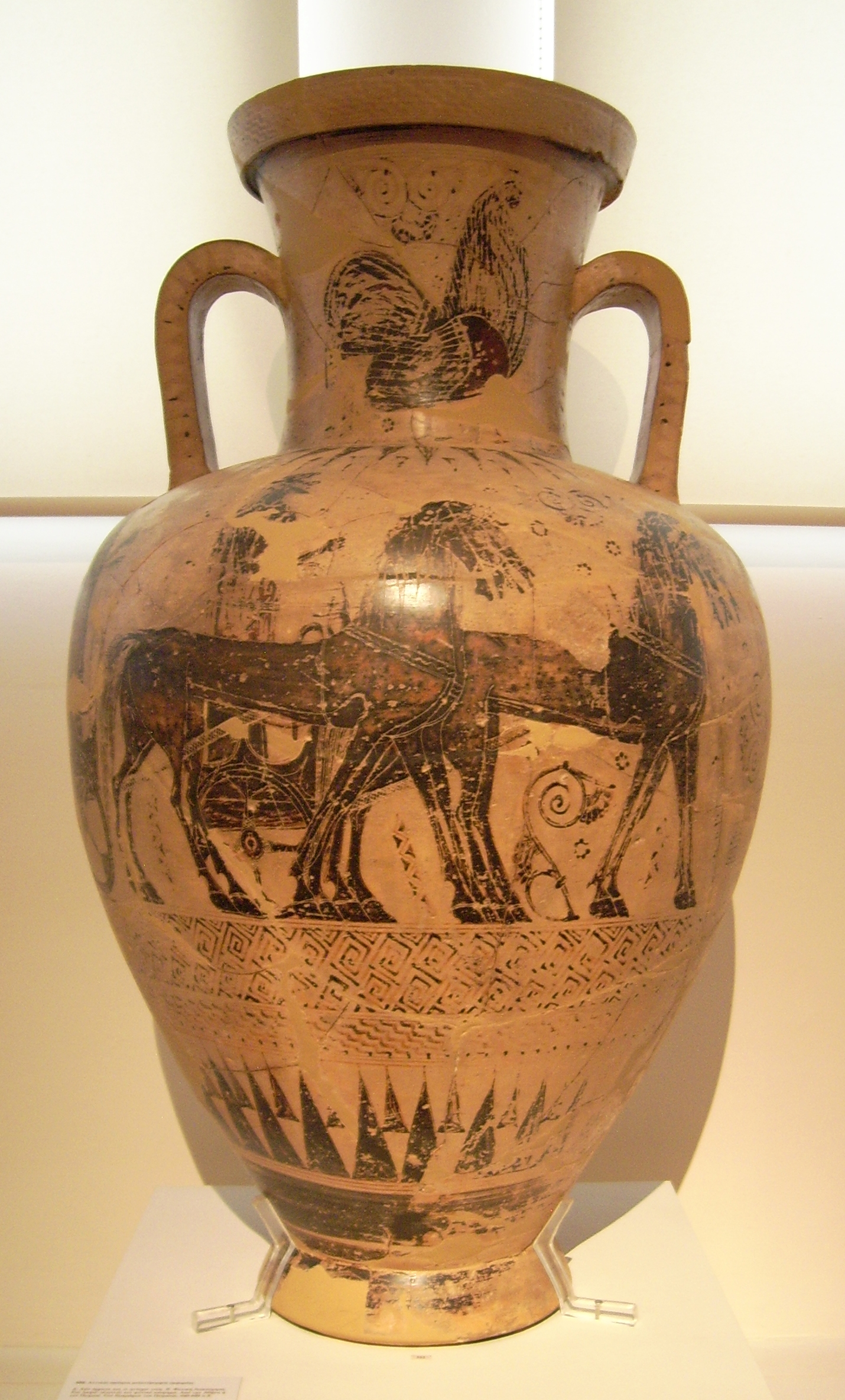
- Early Attic black-figure amphora by the Piraeus Painter, found in Piraeus, Athens: National Archaeological Museum.
- Born: Unknown. Named from the circumstance that the first vase of the style was found in Piraeus, Athens. Before 630 BC
- Died: About 600 BC
- Known for: Vase painting
- Notable work: Amphorae and other pottery decorated with animal figures of much higher quality than the human figures.
- Movement: Black-figure style

The Piraeus Painter was one of the first Attic black-figure vase painters. He was active between 630 and 600 BC.

The Piraeus Painter was a contemporary of the Nessos Painter, whose importance and artistic class he did not reach. His name vase, a neck amphora in Athens, National Archaeological Museum 353, was found at Piraeus. The most noteworthy feature of that vase is the snout of the depicted lion, stylised into the shape of a volute. Images of lions were quite popular at the time, as in the works of the Lion Painter and the Gorgon Painter. Except his animal figures, which display a safe intuition for design and proportions, his other figures appear very stiff and awkward.

== Bibliography ==
- John Beazley: Attic Black-figure Vase-painters. Oxford 1956, p. 2-3.
- John Boardman: Schwarzfigurige Vasen aus Athen. Ein Handbuch, von Zabern, 4. Edn., Mainz 1994 (Kulturgeschichte der Antiken Welt, Vol 1) ISBN 3-8053-0233-9, p. 18.
