= Painter of Palermo 489 =

The Painter of Palermo 489 was an ancient Corinthian vase painter in the black-figure style; his real name is unknown. He was active during the transitional period between orientalising vase painting and black-figure proper (ca. 640–625 BC). He is known especially as the teacher of the Columbus Painter and thus a major indirect influence on several further Early Corinthian artists, such as the Chimaira Painter and the Chimaira Group. Darrell A. Amyx describes him as "the Columbus Painter's great teacher" and a "powerful and accomplished painter". He painted mostly aryballoi.

== Bibliography ==
- Thomas Mannack: Griechische Vasenmalerei. Eine Einführung. Theiss, Stuttgart 2002, p. 101 ISBN 3-8062-1743-2.
