= Oxford Palmette Class =

Ancient Attic kylikes and their makers

The Oxford Palmette Class is the name given both to a class of ancient Attic kylikes and to the group of vase painters that made them.

The Oxford Palmette Class was the last group of artists, or of vases, to precede the Komast cups and Siana cups. They probably developed under East Greek influence out of skyphoi. These pre-Komast cups are larger than earlier cups, and reach about the same size as Komast cups and Siana cups. They feature the first conical cup bases in Attic pottery. The works of the Oxford Palmette Class are dated shortly after 580 BC.

== Bibliography ==
- Thomas Mannack: Griechische Vasenmalerei. Eine Einführung. Theiss, Stuttgart 2002, p. 107 ISBN 3-8062-1743-2.
