= Oreithyia Painter =

Ancient Greek vase painter

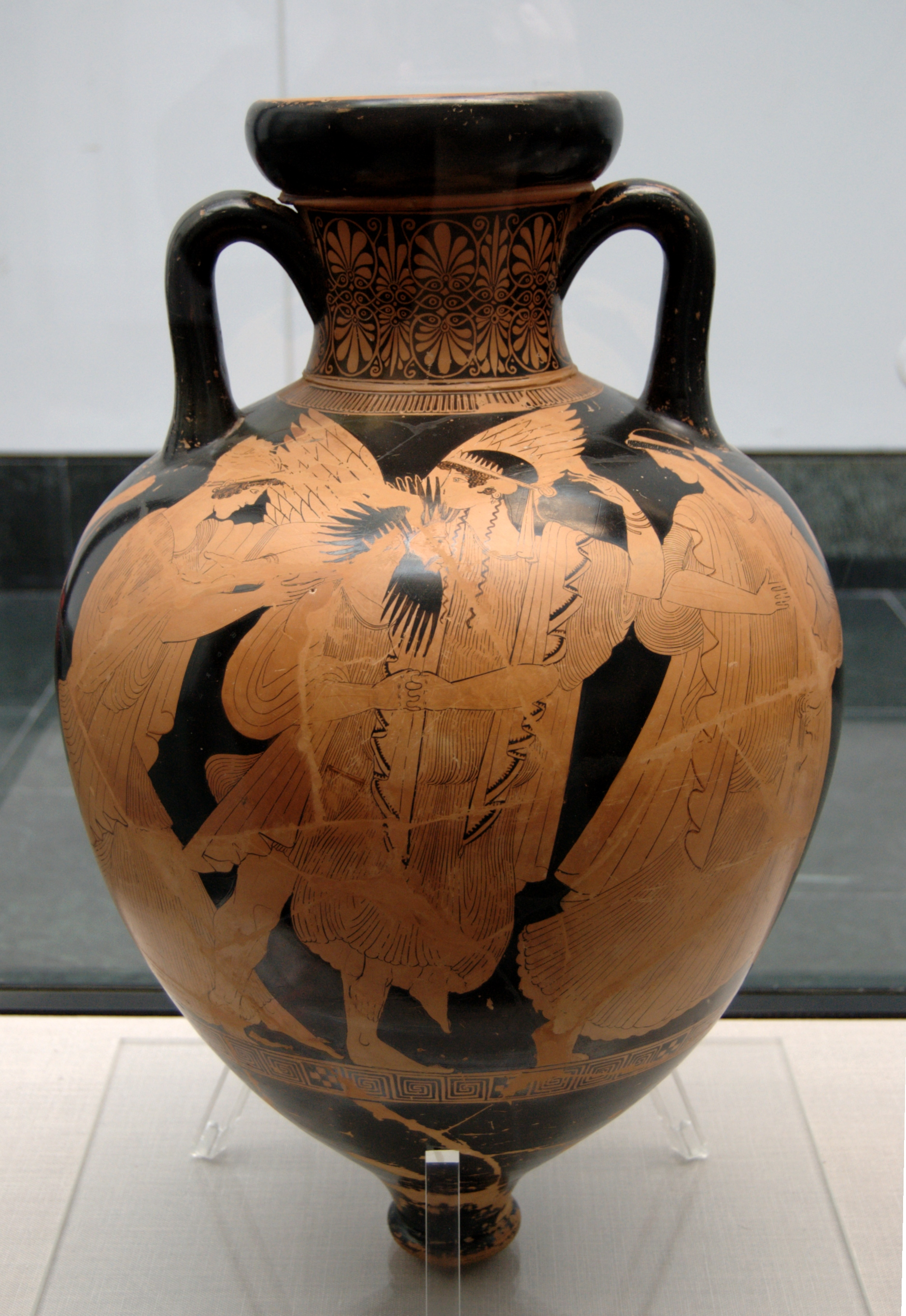
Boreas abducting Oreithyia; Herse (left) trying to help her sister. Attic red-figure pointed amphora, 470–460 BCE. Oreithyia painter (name vase).

The Oreithyia Painter was an ancient Greek red-figure vase painter who flourished from 470–460 BCE. He is one of the many painters of the red-figure Classical Period, but his work is not considered the finest or well-known. This is partly because he began painting during the transition from red-figure to black-figure pottery.

In his early vases he only painted a Side A, adding to his minimalist style. The name Oreithyia Painter was assigned by archaeologist Otto Jahn off the pointed-neck amphora vase held at the Antikensammlung in Munich, Germany (Museum number 2345, Beazley Archive number 206422, ARV number 496.2) depicting the rape of Oreithyia by Boreas. The vase c. 470–460 is inscribed with the names Kekros, Erechsus, Boras, and Oreithya, hence its name.

Twenty-three vases in total have been attributed directly, perhaps, or compared to the Oreithyia Painter, predominantly by John Beazley and Otto Jahn. Other people who have attributed vases to the Oreithyia Painter include Cahn and Dohan. The majority of his work is on larger vases and has been found on lekythoi, amphoras, hydrias, kylixes, and stamnos, as well as various fragments. The provenances of his vases are predominantly from the western shores of Italy and the south western coast of Sicily, which most likely denotes that most of the Oreithyia Painter's work was exported through trade.

The Oreithyia Painter is typically viewed as an independent vase painter during the early 5th century. His works are limited in number and popularity. Earlier in the painter's work, his vases are only one-sided, and typically have limited meander pattern to frame the subjects depicted. Later in his career, the Oreithyia Painter switched to painting both sides and adding more designs around the scenes. He often gives the figures large eyes, strong chins, and longer noses. The style of garments the Oreithyia Painter uses are swallow tail folds and spaghetti folds. With simple designs and mediocre details in the figures, the Oreithyia Painter may have been a new painter during the transition from black-figure to red-figure.

== See also ==
- Pottery of Ancient Greece
- Ancient Greek vase painters
