= Pholoe Painter =

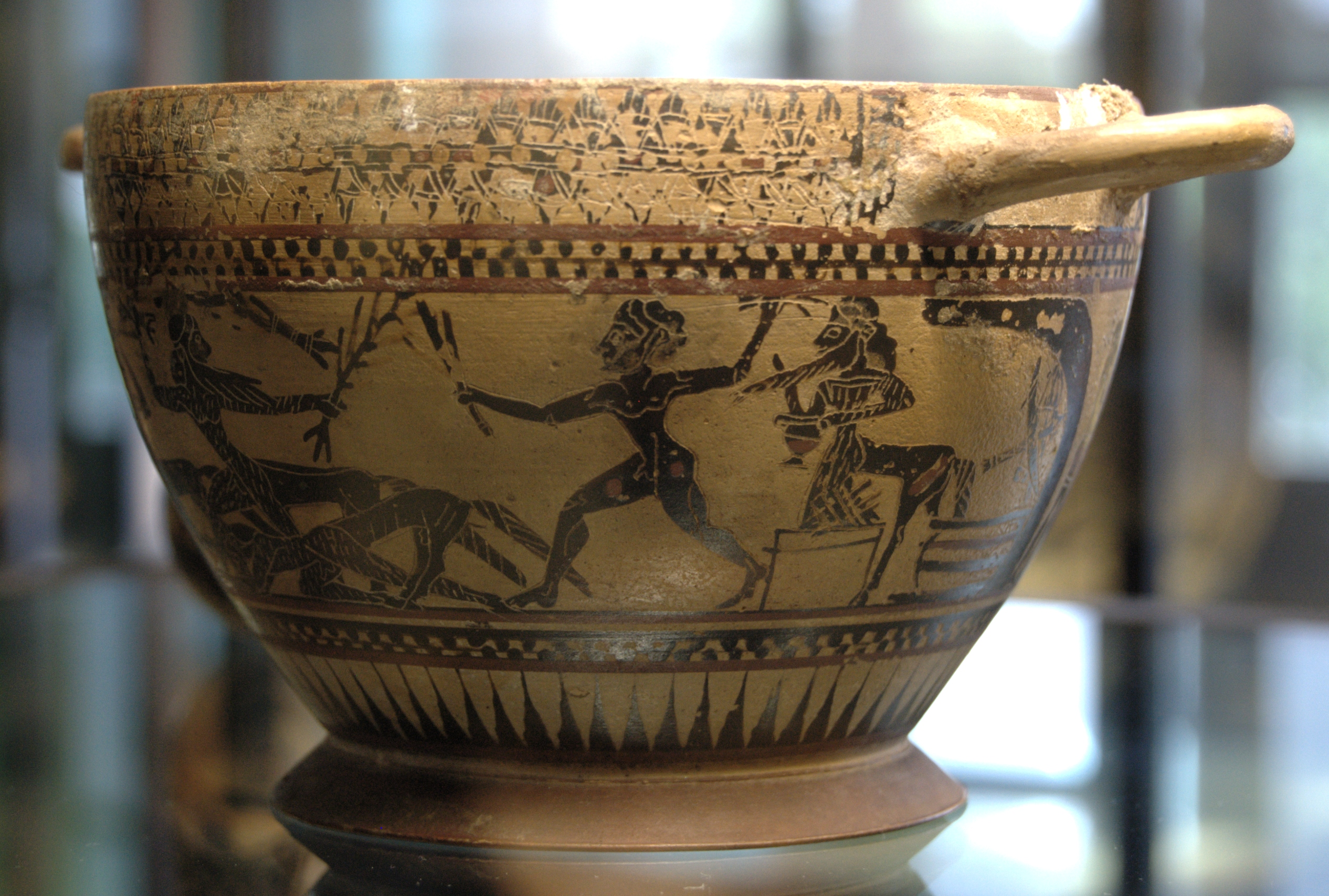
- Name vase: Herakles, Pholos and centaurs in the cave of Pholos; Louvre.
- Born: Unknown; Before 600 BCE
- Known for: Vase painting

The Pholoe Painter was an ancient Corinthian vase painter in the black-figure style; his real name is unknown. He was active during the Middle Corinthian period (c. 600–575 BC) and specialised in decorating skyphoi.

He is named after a skyphos with an image of Herakles in the cave of Pholos, combating several centaurs. The work is dated to about 580 BC. It was discovered in Corinth and acquired by the Louvre in 1884.

== Bibliography ==
- Thomas Mannack: Griechische Vasenmalerei. Eine Einführung. Theiss, Stuttgart 2002, S. 101, ISBN 3-8062-1743-2.
