= Cerameicus Painter =

Unidentified ancient Greek vase painter

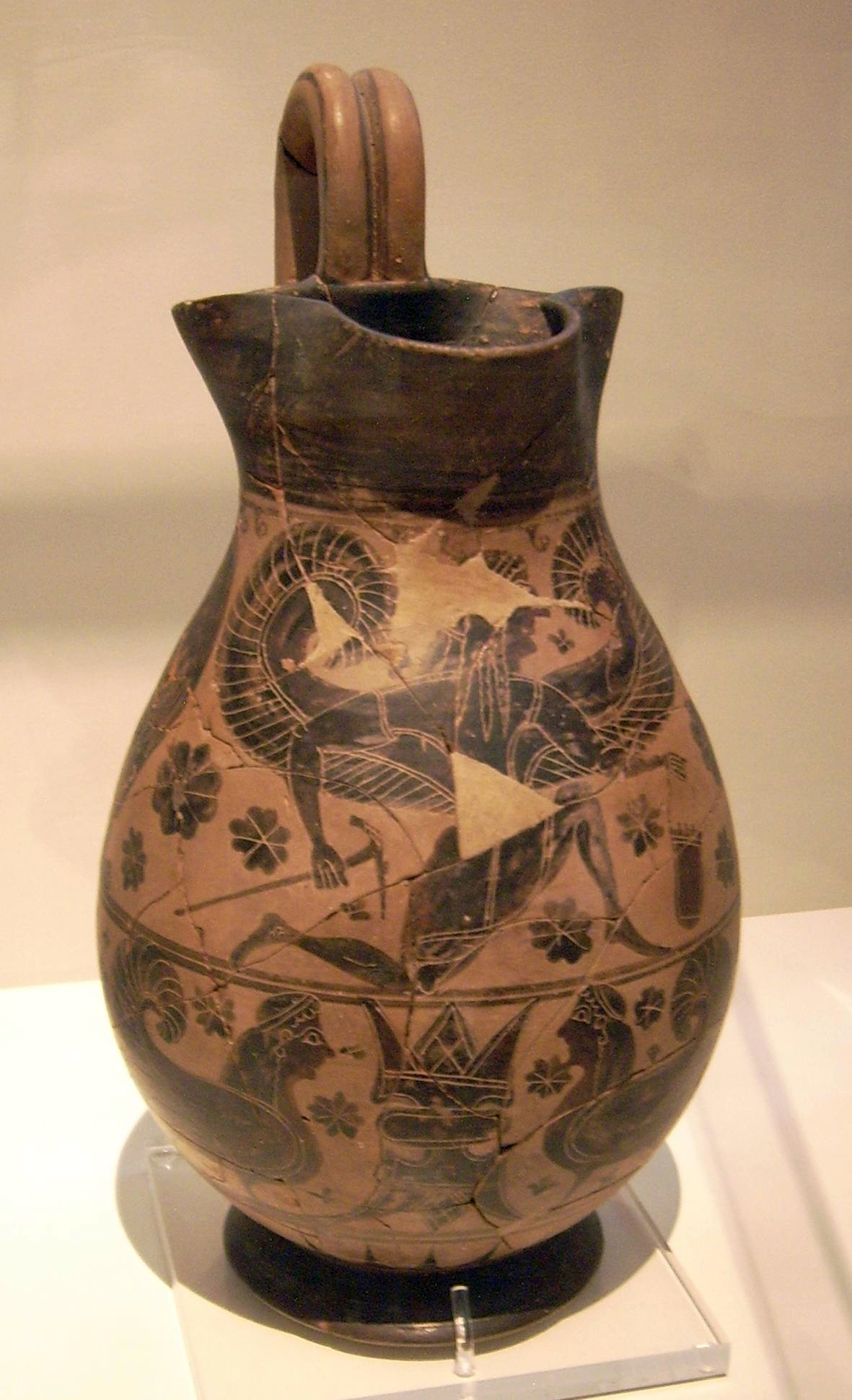
Olpe; upper zone: winged youth (Aristaios) between lions, lower zone: sirens, panther and lotus flowers; circa 600 BC; National Museum, Athens

The Cerameicus Painter (also Kerameikos Painter) was one of the first Attic black-figure vase painters. He was active around 600 BC.

The Cerameicus Painter can be placed stylistically between the Nessos Painter and the Gorgon Painter; he is probably chronologically closer to the latter. He was less productive than the Gorgon Painter and painted in a simple yet fluid style. His name is based on his name vase, found in the Kerameikos of Athens. That vase is an '’olpe’’ and can be considered exemplary of the vase painting of its time. The vase is subdivided into several zones of animal friezes. In the upper area, a single mythological figure is flanked by two lions, the latter a popular motif at the time.

== See also ==
- List of Greek vase painters

== Bibliography ==
- John Beazley: Attic Black-figure Vase-painters. Oxford 1956, pp. 18–20.
- John Boardman: Schwarzfigurige Vasen aus Athen. Ein Handbuch, von Zabern, 4. edn, Mainz 1994 (Kulturgeschichte der Antiken Welt, Vol 1) ISBN 3-8053-0233-9, p. 18.
