= Duel Painter =

Ancient Corinthian vase painter

The Duel Painter was an ancient Corinthian vase painter in the black-figure style; his real name is unknown. He was active during the transitional period between Orientalising vase painting and black-figure proper (c. 640–625 BC). The Duel Painter preferred to decorate his aryballoi with fighting scenes, which is the basis for his conventional name. He was also one of the first Corinthian painters to depict birds.

== Bibliography ==
- Thomas Mannack: Griechische Vasenmalerei. Eine Einführung. Theiss, Stuttgart 2002, p. 101 ISBN 3-8062-1743-2.
