= Honolulu Painter =

Unidentified ancient Greek vase painter

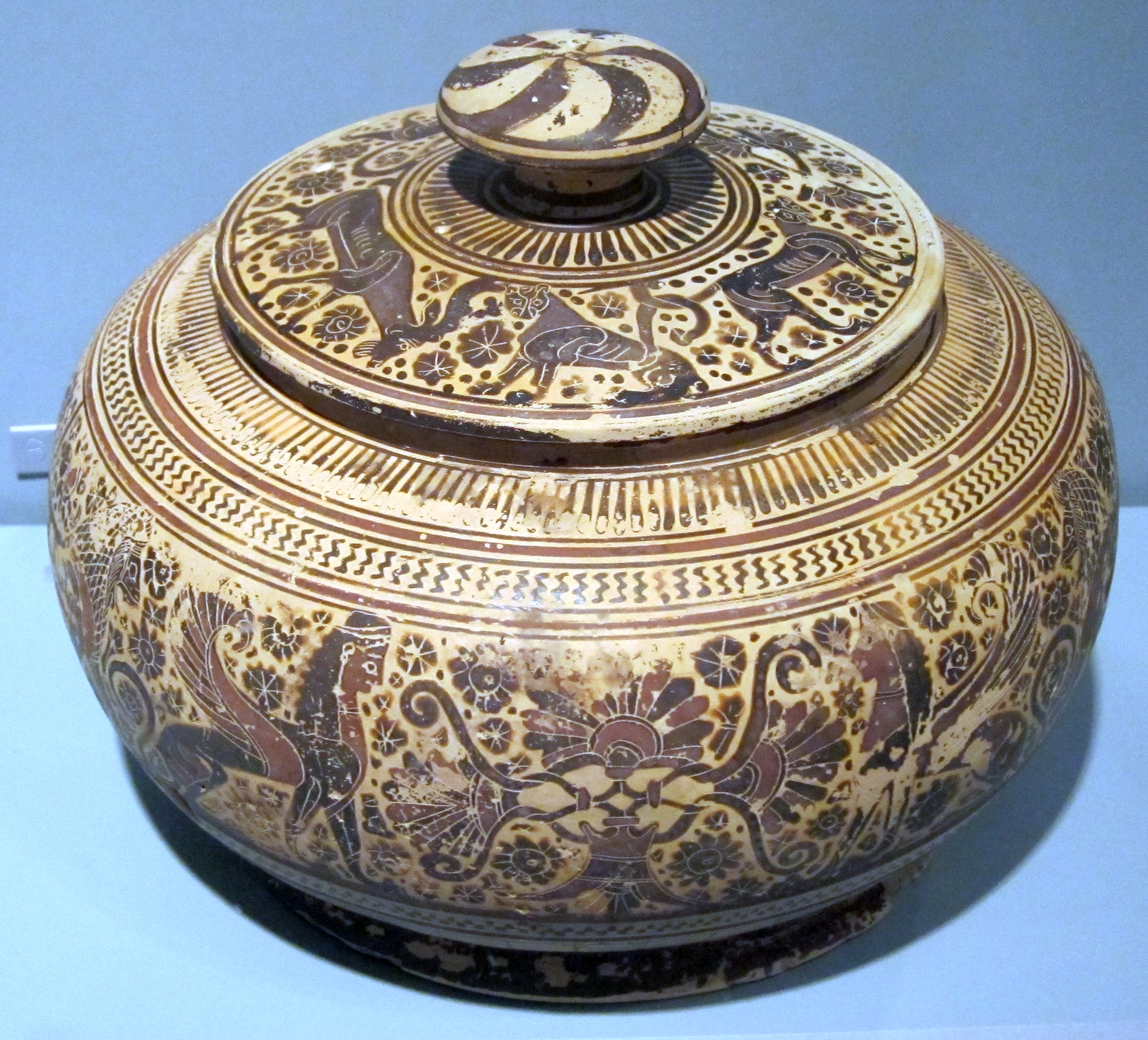
6th century BCE pyxis from Corinth, painted by the Honolulu Painter, Honolulu Museum of Art

The Honolulu Painter is the name given to an ancient Greek artist, who painted designs on pottery in the Greek city-state of Corinth during the sixth century BCE. Since he did not sign his work, his true name is unknown. Based upon stylistic considerations, University of California at Berkeley archeology professor Darrell Arlynn Amyx (1911–1997) recognized several pieces of ancient pottery dispersed in museums around the world as having been painted by the same hand. He named this anonymous artist the Honolulu Painter after his most important work, a pyxis in the collection of the Honolulu Museum of Art.
