= Daybreak Painter =

Ancient Greek vase painter

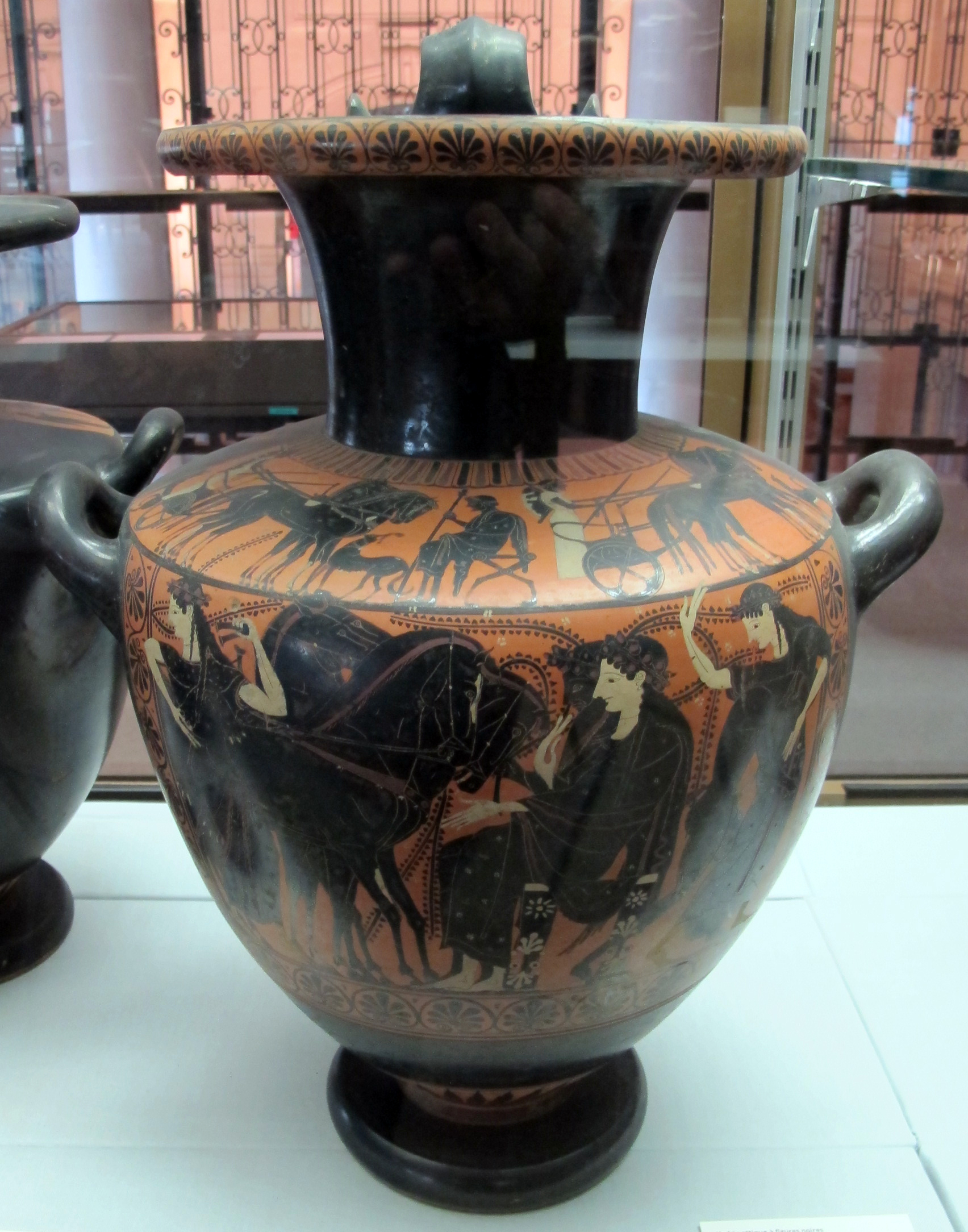
A vase by the Daybreak Painter

The Daybreak Painter was an Attic black-figure vase painter, active in the late sixth and early fifth centuries BC. His real name is not known.

He was of the Leagros Group and painted primarily lekythoi and oinochoai as well as the newly introduced olpe. His work is characterised by a highly developed sense of colour and a good hand for detail.

Haspels gave him the name of Daybreak Painter after his lekythos which depicted the god Helios emerging from the sea.

== See also ==
- Little Masters (Greek vase painting)
- List of Greek vase painters

== Bibliography ==
- John Beazley: Attic Black-figure Vase-painters. Oxford 1956, p.
- John Boardman: Schwarzfigurige Vasen aus Athen. Ein Handbuch, von Zabern, 4. edn, Mainz 1994 (Kulturgeschichte der Antiken Welt, Vol. 1) ISBN 3-8053-0233-9, p. 126
