= Perizoma Group =

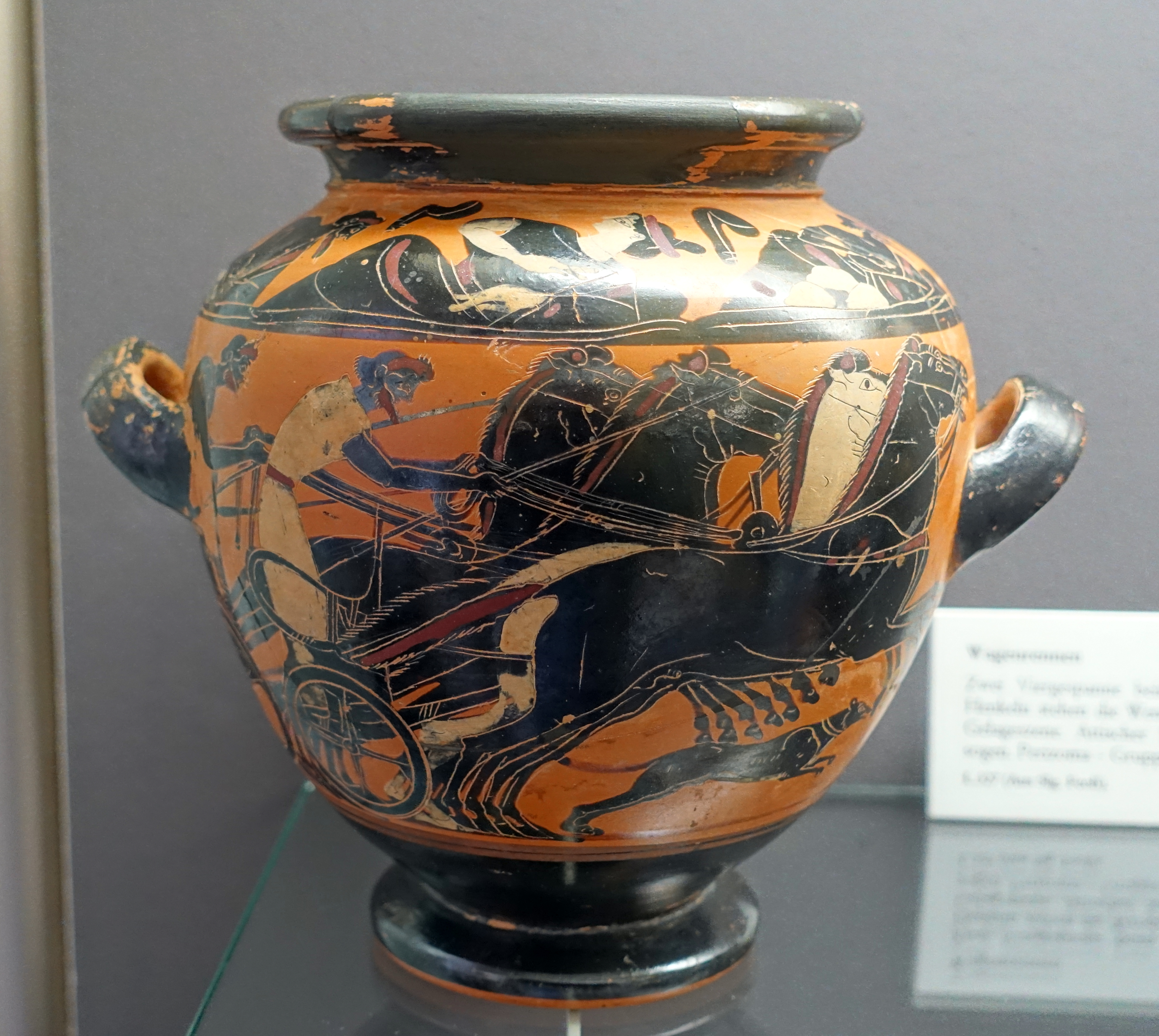
Stamnos with chariot races, Perizoma Group, c. 510 BC

The term Perizoma Group describes a group of Attic black-figure vase painters and a type of vase. They were active approximately 520–510 BC.

The group is named after the perizoma (loincloth) worn by many figures on vases painted by it, especially athletes, armed dancers and symposiasts. The group often painted stamnoi, a vase shape introduced to Athens around 520 BC. The drawing style of the small group is considered as highly distinctive. Its figures, especially athletes, often appear rather weak. Apart from stamnoi, they painted single-handled kantharoi, resembling Etruscan shapes and likely aimed for export to that area.

== Bibliography ==
- John Beazley: Attic Black-Figure Vase-Painters, Oxford 1956, p.
- John Beazley: Paralipomena. Additions to Attic black-figure vase-painters and to Attic red-figure vase-painters. Oxford 1971. p.
- John Boardman: Schwarzfigurige Vasen aus Athen. Ein Handbuch, Mainz 1977 (Kulturgeschichte der Antiken Welt, Band 1) ISBN 3-8053-0233-9, p. 123

== Example ==
- Beazley archive: Image of musicians wearing perizomata, Ahmolean Museum, Oxford
