= Painter of Berlin 1686 =

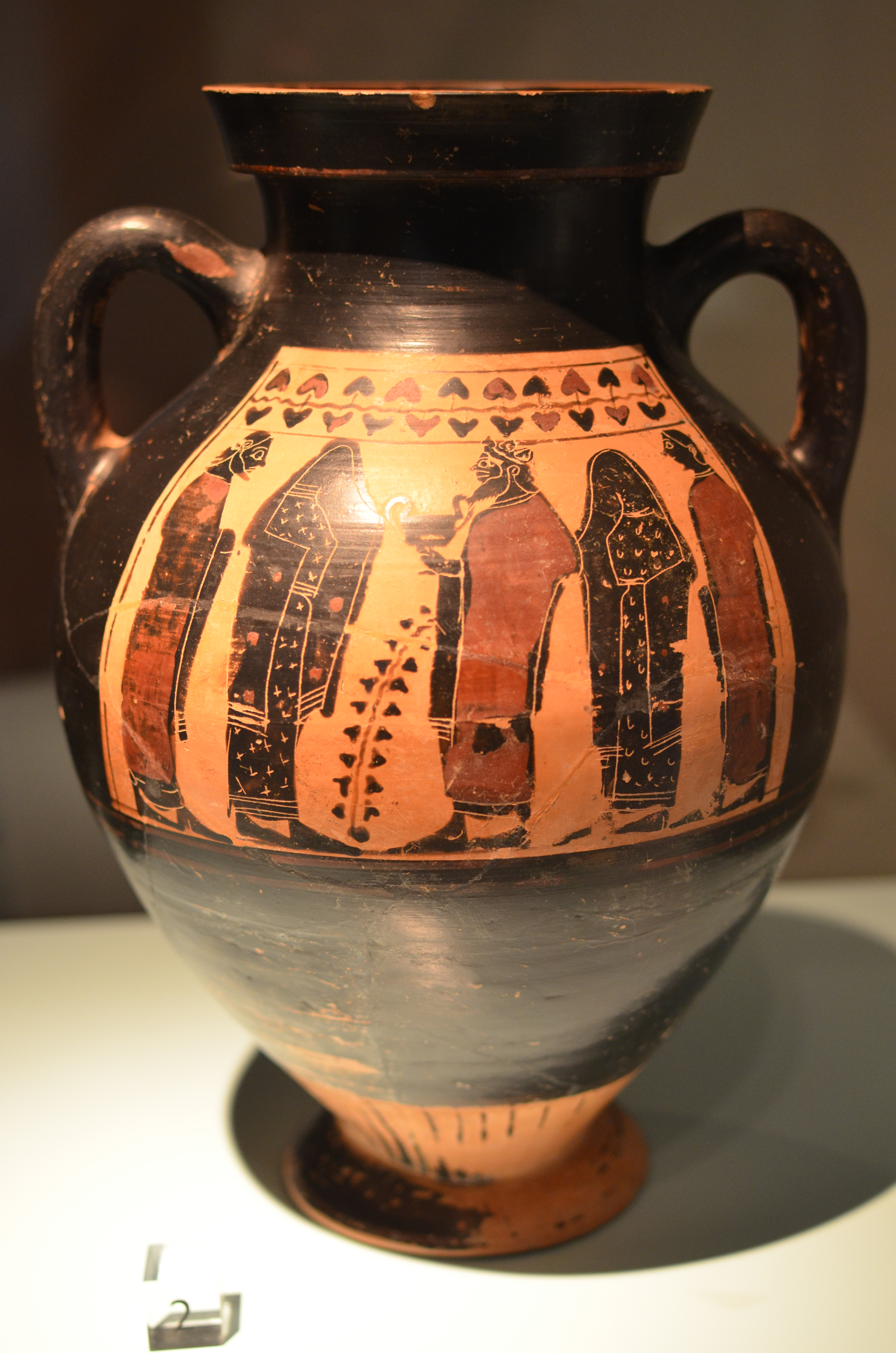
Amphora showing Dionysos and bystanders (Rijksmuseum van Oudheden, the Netherlands).

The Painter of Berlin 1686 was a Greek black-figure vase-painter from Athens who was active from about 550 to 530 BC. Like many other Greek vase painters his real name is unknown, but John Beazley named him after his Amphora F 1686 in the Antikensammlung Berlin.

Consistent individual characteristics of style suggest the existence of a unique artistic personality. Beazley called him the Painter of Berlin 1686 naming him after an amphora in Berlin. His style of painting was close to that of the painters belonging to the so-called Group E. Several vases have been attributed to his hand on the basis of style. He specialized in the decoration of amphorae. For most of his career, he painted rather staid scenes of gods, heroes, and warriors; toward the end of his career, however, he shifted to light-hearted themes that were becoming fashionable in the work of artists such as the Swing Painter. An unusual characteristic of the work of the Painter of Berlin 1686 is his tendency to repeat the same scene with little variation on both sides of a vase.
