= Beldam Painter =

Unidentified ancient Greek vase painter

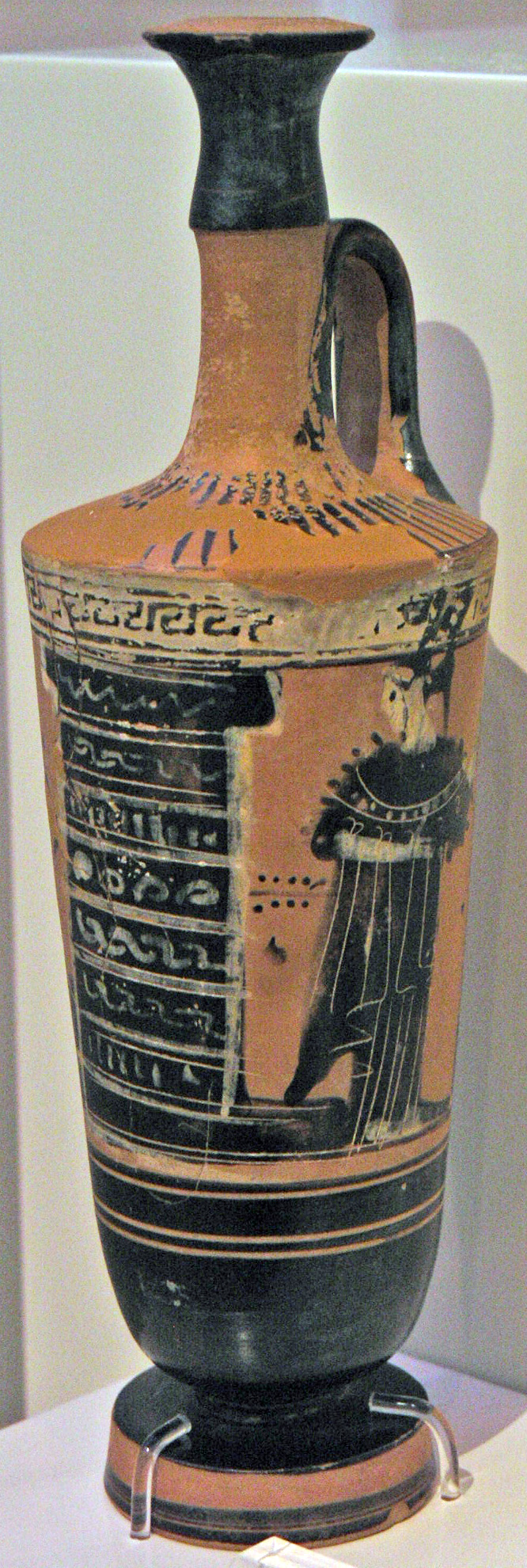
Athena on a lekythos, c. 480 BC, found at Vari, Athens: National Museum Inv. 1061.

The Beldam Painter was an Attic black-figure vase painter, active from around 470 to before 450 BC.

His real name is unknown. The conventional name is derived from his name vase, which depicts an unidentified older female being tortured by several satyrs. He was one of the latest representatives of his style. The products of his workshop are considered the final evidence for large-scale production of black-figure vases in Athens. Stylistically, his work is closely connected to that of the Haimon Group.

He continued the tradition of small narrow lekythoi. The smallest have chimney-like mouths, sharply carinated shoulders and high, simple feet. Already early in his career, he produced high-quality drawings, especially on larger lekythoi, considered better than those by the Haimon Group. A striking characteristic of his work are garlands of ivy used as a decorative motif on the necks of many of his lekythoi. Sometimes they are simple outlines, often on the same vessels as funeral scenes. These grave lekythoi are the first of their type in Athens, where they were produced in large numbers from then onwards. Especially typical of his and his workshop's creations is the use of white ground under the ornamental friezes, and more generally, the generous use of white paint. Another characteristic of the artist's work are plant and checkerboard patterns on white ground, subsequently copied by other workshops. His palmette-lekythoi resemble the works of the Class of Athens 581.

== See also ==
- List of Greek vase painters

== Bibliography ==
- C. H. Emilie Haspels: Attic black-figured lekythoi, Paris 1936, p. 170-191. 266-269. 367.
- John Boardman: Schwarzfigurige Vasen aus Athen. Ein Handbuch, Mainz 1977, ISBN 3-8053-0233-9, p. 162.
