= Princeton Painter =

Ancient Greek vase painter

The Princeton Painter was an Attic black-figure vase painter, active in the third quarter of the sixth century BC, just after Group E. His real name is not known.

He is a typical representative of the Attic vase painting of his time. He mainly painted neck amphorae and belly amphorae of the types then current. His motifs also conform to the patterns popular at the time, with few variations. He was aware of the artistic developments of his period, but only able to incorporate them into his works to a limited extent. In artistic terms, he is no comparison to his dominant contemporary, Exekias. The vases by him and other artists demonstrate that there was still scope for development in the black-figure style.

== Gallery ==
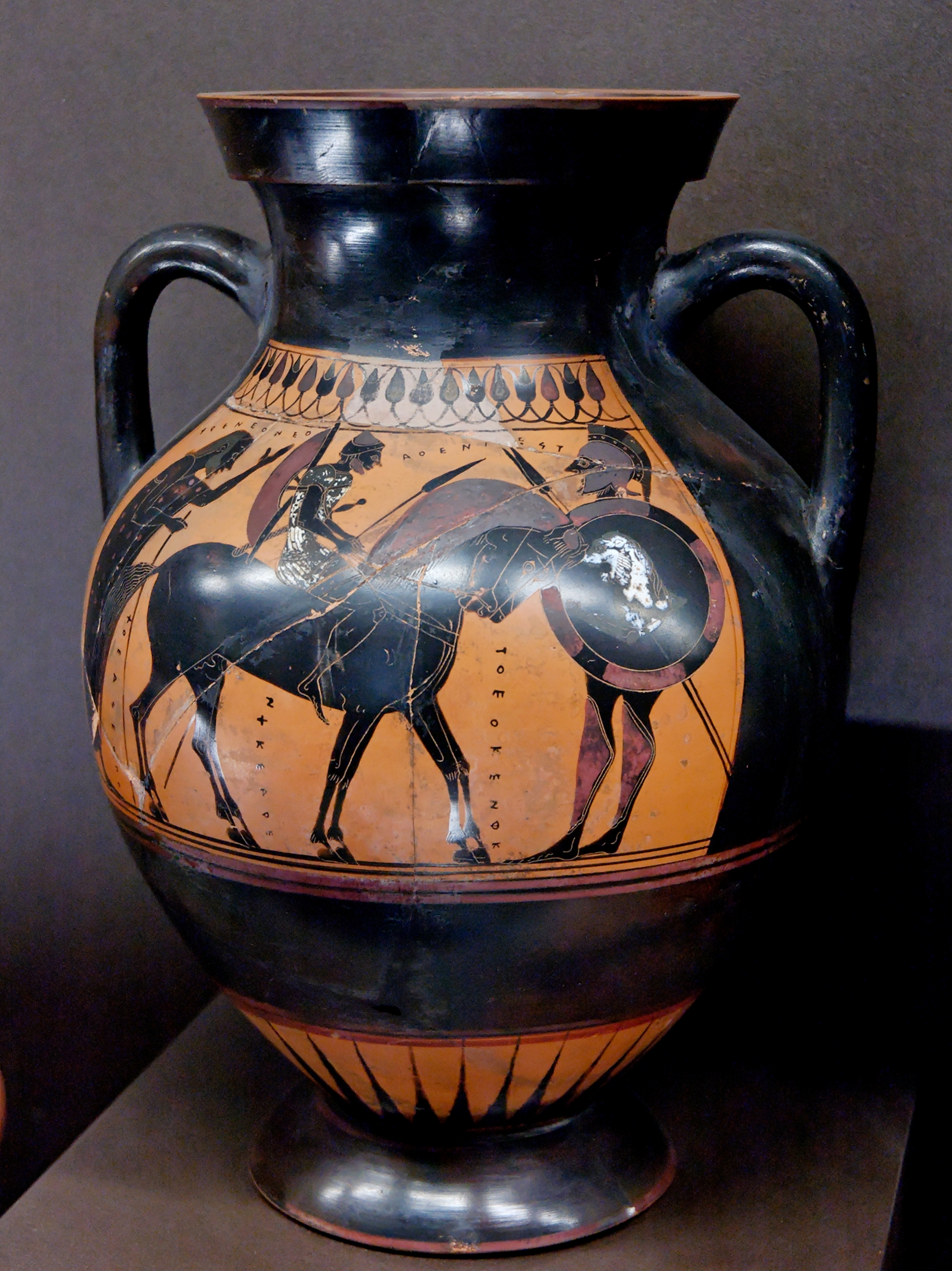
A warrior's departure, amphora, circa 550/540 BC. Paris: Louvre

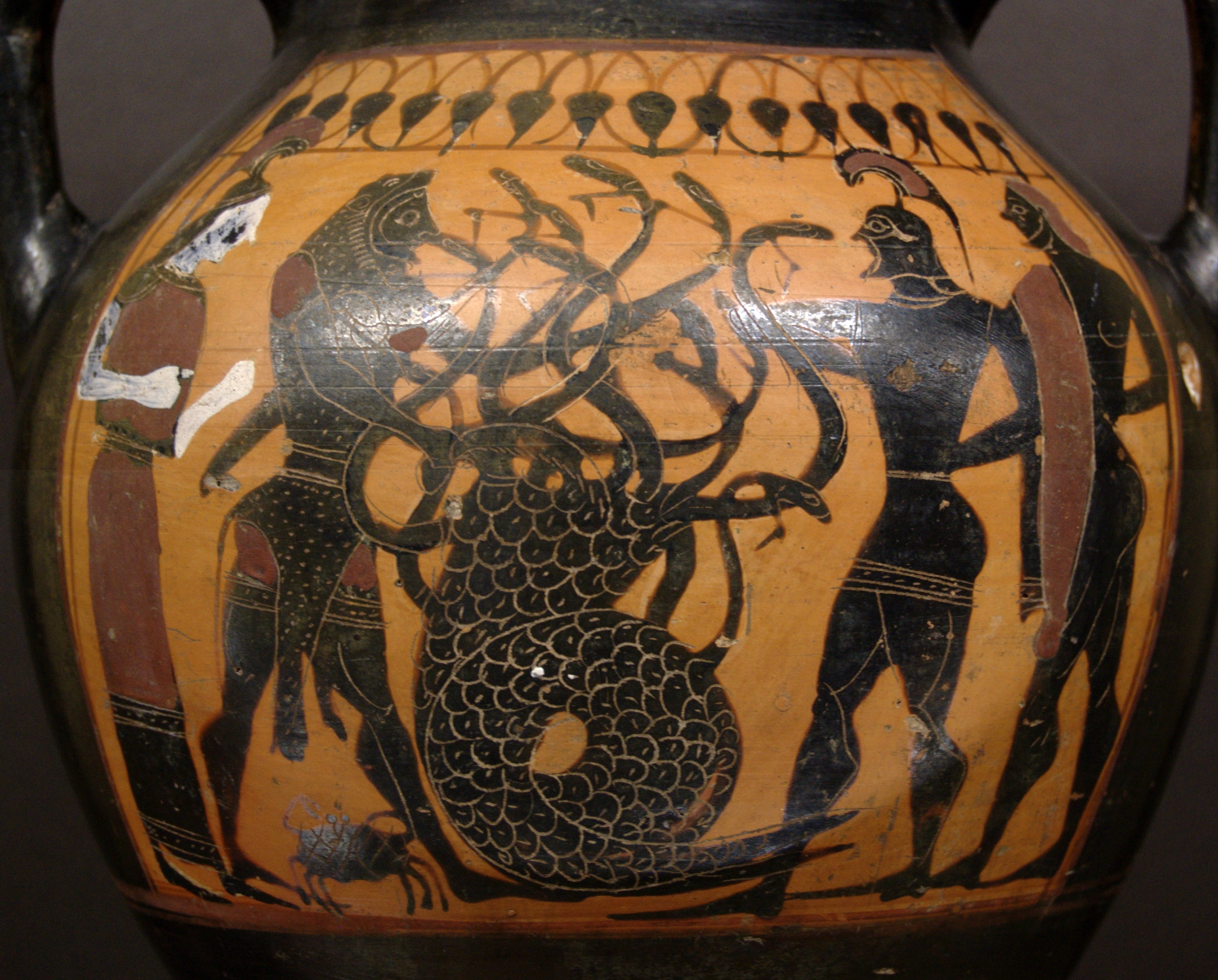
Herakles fighting the Lernaean Hydra, circa 540/530 BC. Paris: Louvre

== Bibliography ==
- John Beazley: Attic Black-Figure Vase-Painters, Oxford 1956, p.
- John Boardman: Schwarzfigurige Vasen aus Athen. Ein Handbuch, Mainz 1977, ISBN 3-8053-0233-9, p. 70f.
- Mary B Moore: "The Princeton Painter in New York", Metropolitan Museum Journal Vol. 42 (2007), pp. 21-56
