= Polos Painter =

Ancient Greek vase painter

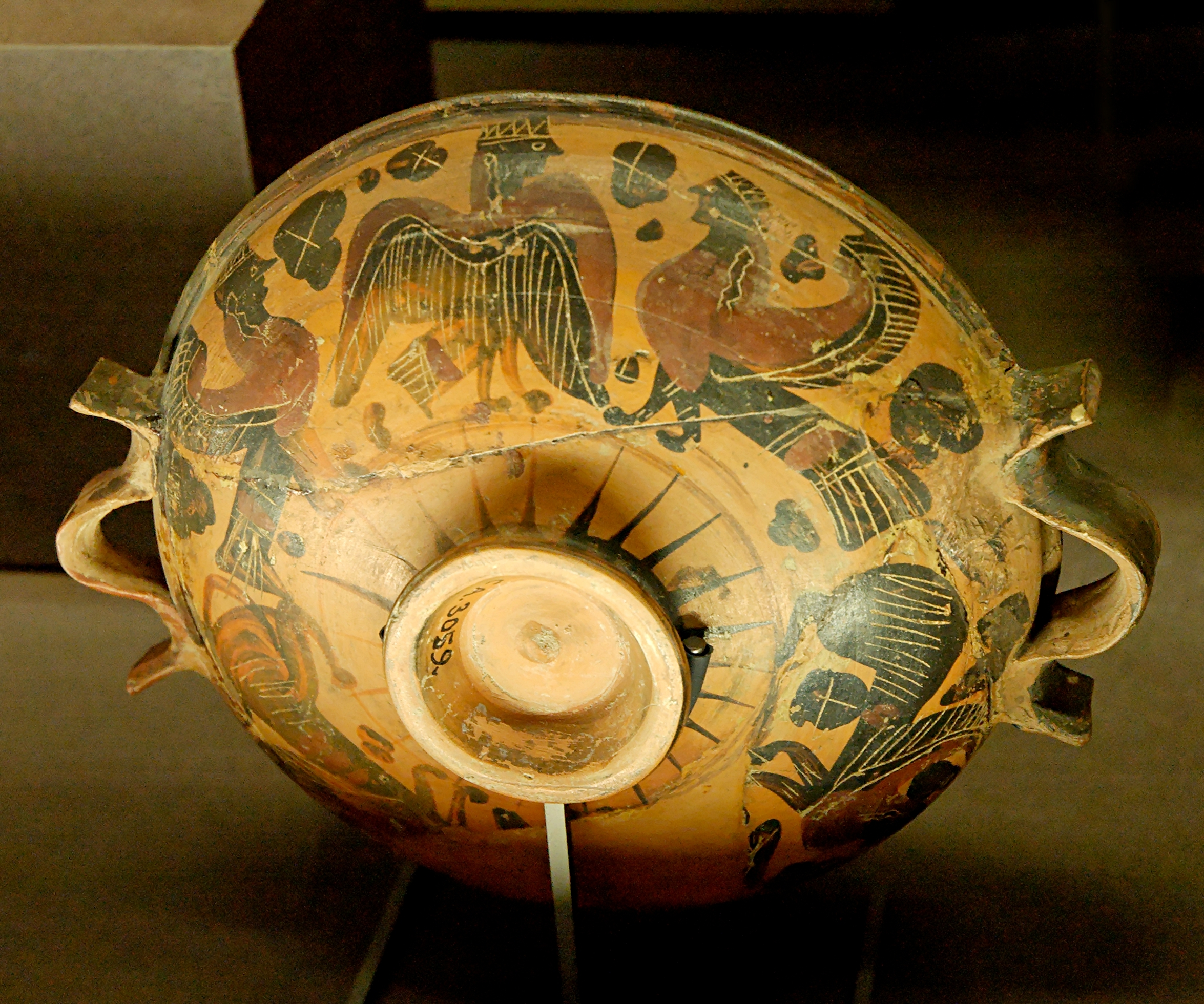
Sirens on a Lekane by the Polos Painter, c. 600–575 BC Louvre CA 3059

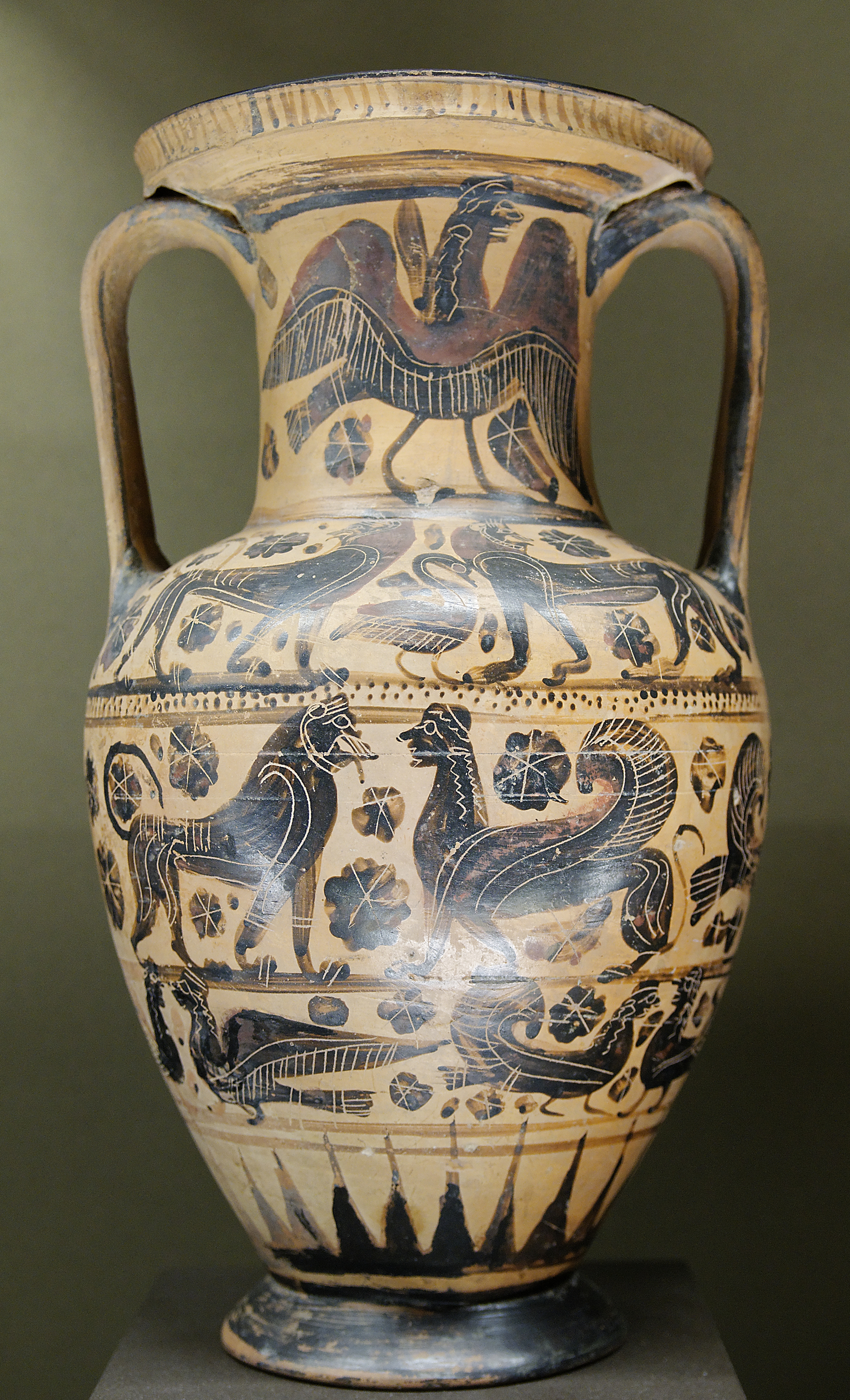
Louvre E814

The Polos Painter was a vase painter of the Attic black-figure style. His works date to c. 575 to 565 BC.

The Polos Painter is considered to have a distinctive personal style, while only being of mediocre artistic talent. Stylistically, he resembles the earlier Ragusa Group, which was strongly influenced by Corinthian vase painting. He was very productive. Most of his vases were decorated with “degenerate animal friezes” (John Boardman). His conventional name is based on the cross-hatched polos crowns worn by the women, animals and sirens he painted. More than 100 known vases and fragments are ascribed to him. His works were widely spread across the Greek world, presumably among less discerning customers; they have been found from Athens and Attica via Southern Italy to Spain, the Cyrenaica, Egypt and Asia Minor. He decorated all vase shapes then current; but preferred plates and lekanes.

== Works (selection) ==
- Paris, Louvre

CA 3059 Lekanis
Cp 10501 Fragment of a belly amphora

- Reading, Ure Museum of Greek Archaeology

14.9.82 Fragment einer of a painted terracotta
14.9.83 Fragment of a lekanis

- San Francisco, Fine Arts Museums

1925.364 Skyphos

== Bibliography ==
- John Beazley: Attic Black-figure Vase-painters. Oxford 1956, p. 43-49. 708.
- A. Arribas; G. Trías: Un vaso del Pintor del Polos de Ampurias, in: Archivo español de arqueología 34 (1961) p. 168-177.
- John D. Beazley: Paralipomena. Additions to Attic black-figure vase-painters and to Attic red-figure vase-painters, Oxford 1971, p. 20-22.
- Maria Grazia Costagli Marzi: Il cratere del Pittore del Polos nel Museo Archeologico di Firenze, in: Archaeologica. Scritti in onore di Aldo Neppi Modona, Florenz 1975, p. 173-181.
- John Boardman: Schwarzfigurige Vasen aus Athen. Ein Handbuch, von Zabern, Mainz 1977(Kulturgeschichte der Antiken Welt, Vol 1) ISBN 3-8053-0233-9, p. 22.
