= Skythes =

Ancient Greek vase painter

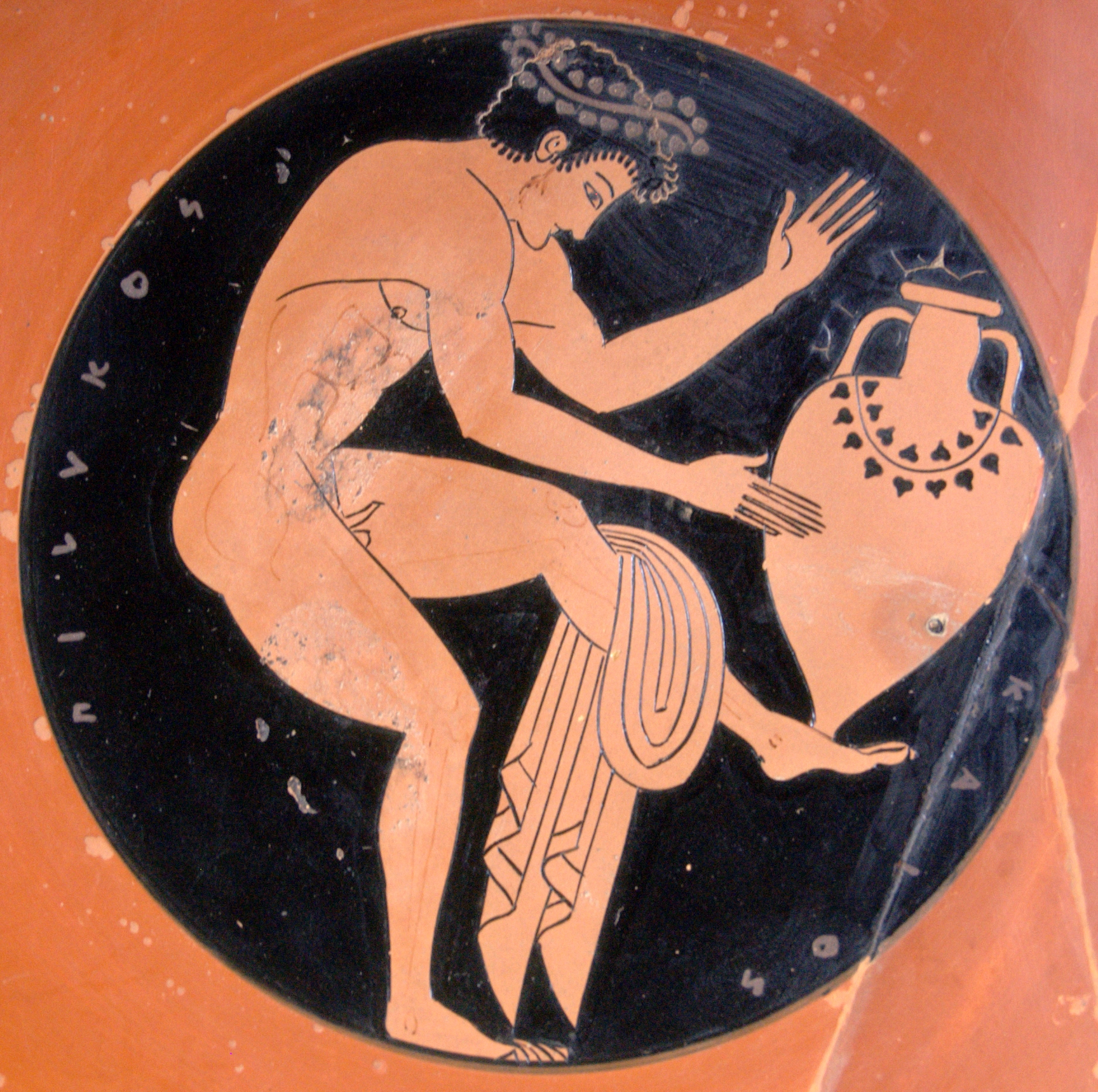
Komast on the tondo of a bilingual cup inscribed ΕΠΙΛΥΚΟΣ ΚΑΛΟΣ, Epilykos kalos ("Epilykos is beautiful"), circa 510/500 BC. Paris: Louvre

Skythes (Greek: Σκύθης, the Scythian) was an Attic black-figure and red-figure vase painter active between about 520 and 505 BC.

Modern scholarship considers Skythes as a kind of artistic loner, whose work cannot easily be categorised among the known workshops and groups. He signed four known kylikes. Further, another ca. twenty kylikes and two dinos stands are attributed to him on the basis of stylistic analysis. His early works were created a short time after the invention of the red-figure technique. On three bilingual works he demonstrates his skill in the older black-figure style. Unusually, they feature red-figure paintings on the interior and on the outside black-figure on coral-red ground. Inside and outside each bear only one figure. He belonged to the first generation of vase painters to specialise in cups.

His figural images depict people in an exaggerated ugliness or brutishness, casting him, much in contrast to the norms then prevailing in Greek art, as a comedian, even a satirist. Especially his faces reflect an outré sense of humour. Perhaps this indicates, as does his name, that he was not a native Athenian, although he was well aware of the city's artistic repertoire. Although he was probably not a Scythian, the (self-chosen) nickname appears to express a certain extravagance or individualism. Two pinakes with black-figure paint that were found the Athenian Acropolis bear the signature of a Skythes. It is assumed that they are also by him.

His vases occasionally bear the kalos inscription Epilykos. The Pedieus Painter uses the same name, which has led some scholars to suggest that he is identical with Skythes towards the end of his career. On a vase by Phintias, the same Epilykos is depicted as an athlete. For some time, such vases were falsely ascribed to a non-existent painter Epilykos. The use of the name classifies Skythes as a member of the Epilykos Class.

== Bibliography ==
- Ricardo Olmos Romera: "Skythes", in Künstlerlexikon der Antike, p. 434-436
- John Boardman: Rotfigurige Vasen aus Athen. Die archaische Zeit. Ein Handbuch, von Zabern, Mainz 1981 (= 4. edn. 1994) (Kulturgeschichte der Antiken Welt, Vol. 4), ISBN 3-8053-0234-7 p. 67
