= Hypobibazon Class =

The Hypobibazon Class was a group of Attic black-figure vase painters and a type of vase. They belong to the period around 510 BC.

The conventional name Hypobibazon Class is derived from its name vase, which depicts a warrior mounting a horse. The class consists of belly amphorae in a modernised form with rounded feet and handles. That vase shape was much rarer during the time of the group's activity than in earlier times. Typical for the group are meanders above the pictorial fields. The image field itself usually contains only few figures, which are especially striking because of this. The group favoured non-mythological motifs, e.g. a fisherman (accompanied by a dog only visible as a sketch) or men carrying pottery vessels.

== Bibliography ==
- John Beazley: Attic Black-Figure Vase-Painters, Oxford 1956, p.
- John Beazley: Paralipomena. Additions to Attic black-figure vase-painters and to Attic red-figure vase-painters. Oxford 1971. p.
- John Boardman: Schwarzfigurige Vasen aus Athen. Ein Handbuch, Mainz 1977, ISBN 3-8053-0233-9, p. 122f.

== External sources ==
- Vase image with fisherman and dog, Berlin
