= Harrow Painter =

Ancient Greek vase painter

The Harrow Painter was an ancient Greek painter of archaic red-figure pottery. The painter was named by John Beazley after an oinochoe in the Old Speech Room Gallery collection of Harrow School. The oinochoe shows a picture of a handsome boy holding a hoop. Thirty-nine vases have been attributed to the Harrow Painter.

== Sources ==
- The Perseus Project - The Harrow Painter
