= Ampersand Painter =

Ancient Greek artist

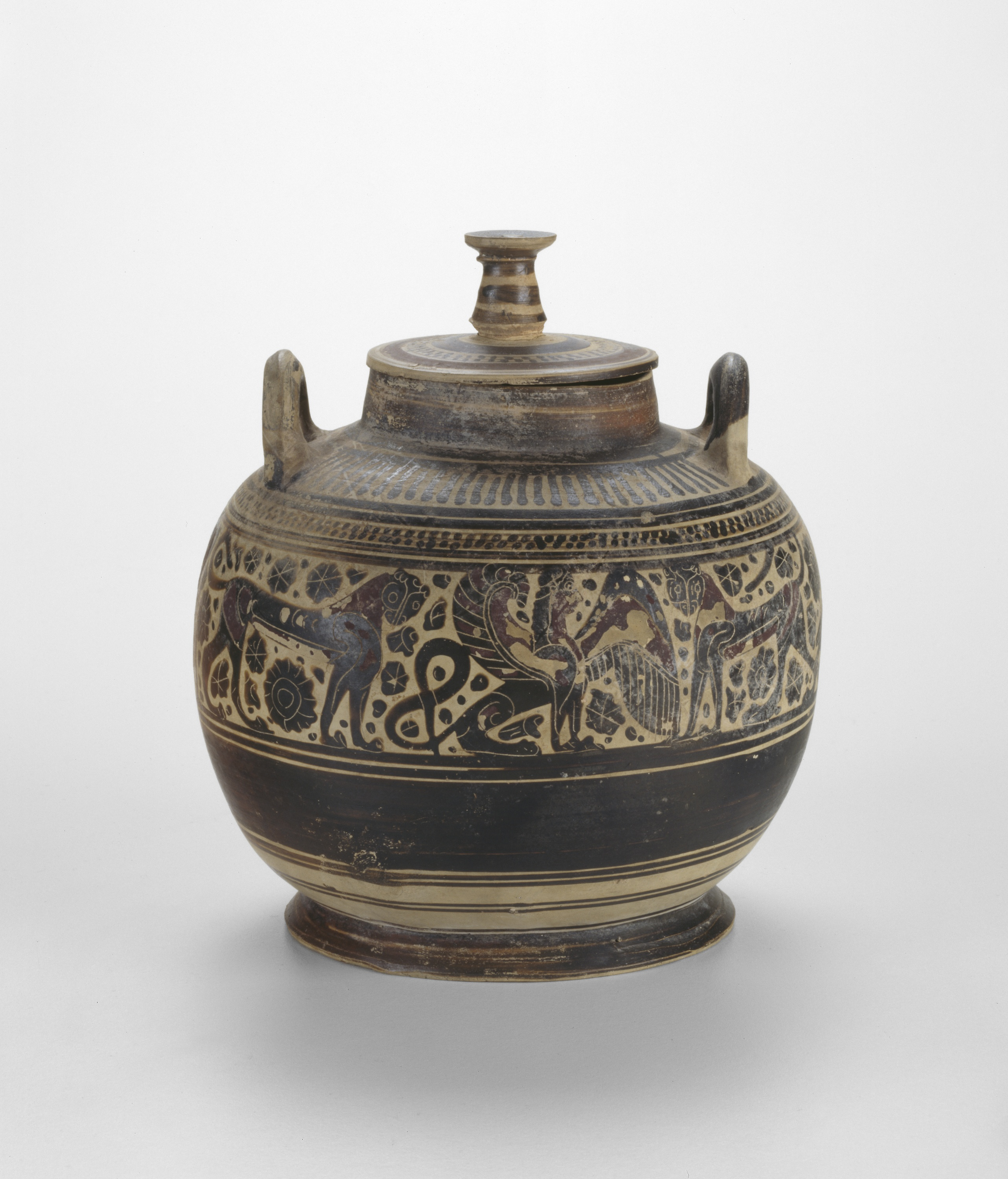
The Ampersand Painter. Pyxis (Container for Personal Objects). 580–570 BCE. The Art Institute of Chicago.

The Ampersand Painter was an ancient Greek artist known for creating vases and painted works.

== Identity ==
Like many ancient Greek artists, the real identity of the Ampersand Painter is not known. His modern name comes from the style of how he depicts the tail of a sphinx (a composite figure that combines a winged feline with a human head). In his vases, he paints the tail of the sphinx in a shape resembling an ampersand, which is shorthand for the word “and” (using the symbol &).

The “name vase” for this artist entered the collection of the Art Institute of Chicago in 1905. The object is a pyxis (small container for personal objects) and dates to about 580–570 BCE and is one of the artist’s earliest works. Only about 15 vases have been attributed to the Ampersand Painter. The scenes created by this painter demonstrate near eastern influences in style and design. The preeminent scholar of Greek vase painters, John Beazley, attributed a number of vases to the Ampersand Painter; the scenes never depicts human figures, only animals, both imaginary and real.

The Ampersand Painter was active during the Archaic period (700–480 BCE) of ancient Greece, a time when influences from Eastern and Egyptian objects were making their way into the Mediterranean region. The city of Corinth, Greece, was a major trading post for much of this period and lead the way in adopting these new motifs onto vases. The Ampersand Painter was a Corinthian painter who decorated terracotta vases using the black-figure technique, which involved figures being painted in black with details created through incised lines. There is also a movement at this time to decorate every surface of the vase, leaving few empty spaces.
