= Columbus Painter =

Ancient Greek vase painter

The Columbus Painter was an ancient Corinthian vase painter in the black-figure style; his real name is unknown. He was active during the transitional period between orientalising vase painting and black-figure proper (c. 640–625 BC). He was a pupil of the Painter of Palermo 489 and, in turn, the teacher of the Chimaira Painter and thus a major influence on the Chimaira Group dominated by the latter. Characteristic are his powerful lions. He painted especially aryballoi.

== Bibliography ==
- Thomas Mannack: Griechische Vasenmalerei. Eine Einführung. Theiss, Stuttgart 2002, p. 101 ISBN 3-8062-1743-2.
