= Madrid Painter =

Ancient Greek vase painter

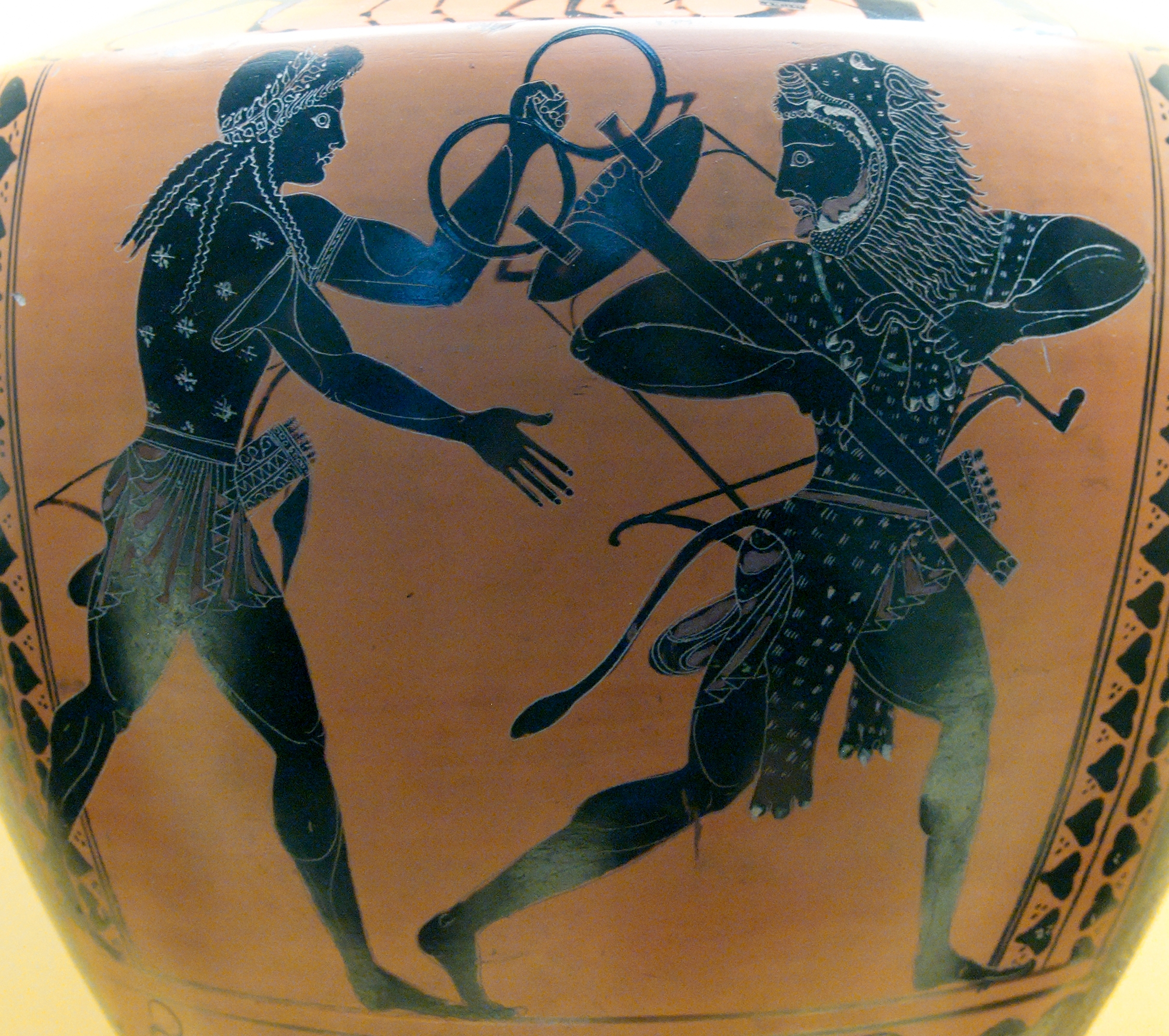
Fight between Apollo and Herakles over the Delphic tripod, hydria, circa 520 BC. Madrid: Museo Arqueológico Nacional de España.

The Madrid Painter was an Attic black-figure vase painter active during the late period of the style, around 520 BC.

He was active during the time when the red-figure style was in the process of gradually replacing black-figure as the dominant technique. His works are noticeably influenced by the new developments, but tend to follow the older traditions. Thus, he does paint anatomical detail and uses new postures influenced by the new style. Thus, he depicts a shield using perspective foreshortening or one leg in a frontal, the other in a side view, on a figure of the dying Kyknos. But the same vase shows features the outmoded animal frieze predella along with such new elements. His conventional name is derived from a vase held by the Museo Arqueológico Nacional de España in Madrid.

== Bibliography ==
- John Beazley: Attic Black-Figure Vase-Painters, Oxford 1956, p.
- John Beazley: Paralipomena. Additions to Attic black-figure vase-painters and to Attic red-figure vase-painters. Oxford 1971. p.
- John Boardman: Schwarzfigurige Vasen aus Athen. Ein Handbuch, Mainz 1977, ISBN 3-8053-0233-9, p. 123
