= Snub-nose Painter =

Ancient Greek red-figure vase painter

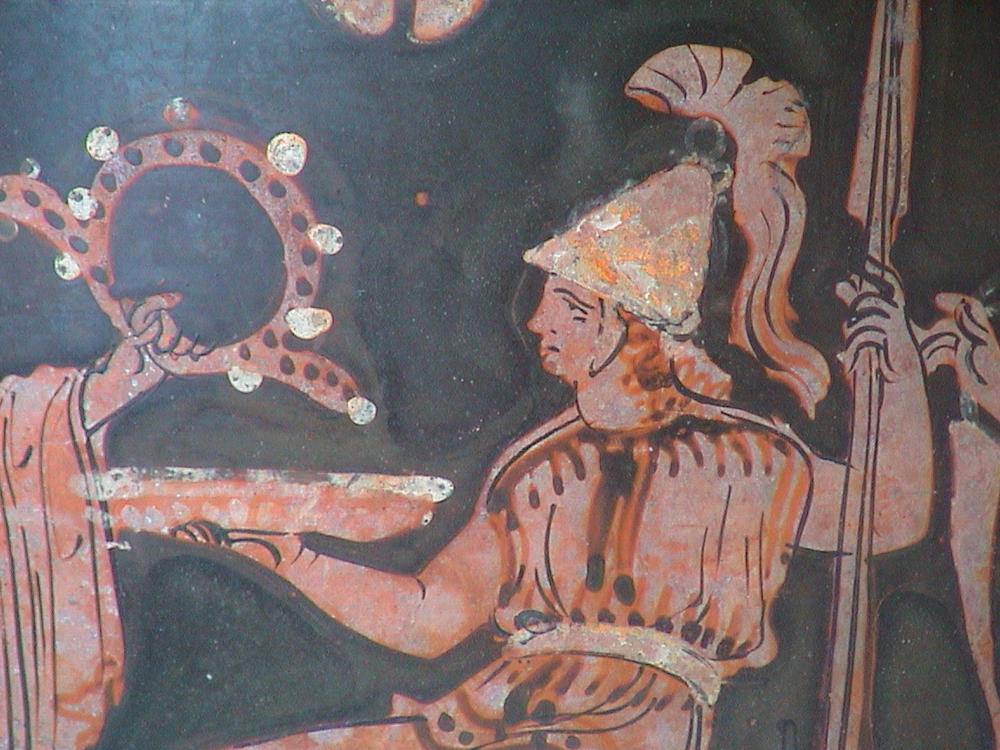
Detail of the exterior decoration of a column-krater by the Snub-nose Painter (c.370–350 BC) REDMG:1951.148

The Snub-nose Painter (Italian: Pittore dei nasi camusi) (fl. 4th century BC) was an Apulian pottery painter so named for his distinctive manner of painting the noses of his subjects.

Followers include the Laterza Painter and the Painter of the Truro Pelike.

== Works ==
- Column-krater, Parco archeologico di Monte Sannace
- Column-krater, the Museo Archeologico di Bari (n. 2206)
- Oinochòe with trilobate mouth, Museo archeologico provinciale Sigismondo Castromediano
- Bell-shaped krater, Museo archeologico provinciale Sigismondo Castromediano (n. 4811)
- Oinochòe with trilobate mouth, Vatican
- Column-krater, Archeological Civic Museum (MCA) of Bologna

== Bibliography ==
- L. Laurenzi, C. V. A., Bologna, III, 1936, IV Dr, tav. 17, pp. 3–4
- M. Bernardini, in Atti del II Congresso Stor. Pugliese e del Congresso Internaz. di Studi Salentini, Bari 1952, pp. 19–20
- A. D. Trendall, Vasi antichi dipinti del Vaticano, Vasi italioti ed etruschi a figure rosse, II, Città del Vaticano 1955, p. 189 ss
- M. Bernardini, in Not. Scavi, 1957, p. 418
- B. M. Scarfì, Due pittori àpuli della seconda metà del IV secolo a. C., in Arch. Class., XI, 1959, pp. 185–188
- B. M. Scarfì, Scavi nella zona di Monte Sannace, in Mon. Ant. Lincei, vol. XLV, 1960, c. 167 ss
- NASI CAMUSI, Pittore dei entry (in Italian) in the Enciclopedia Treccani
