= Tarquinia Painter =

5th-century BC Greek vase painter

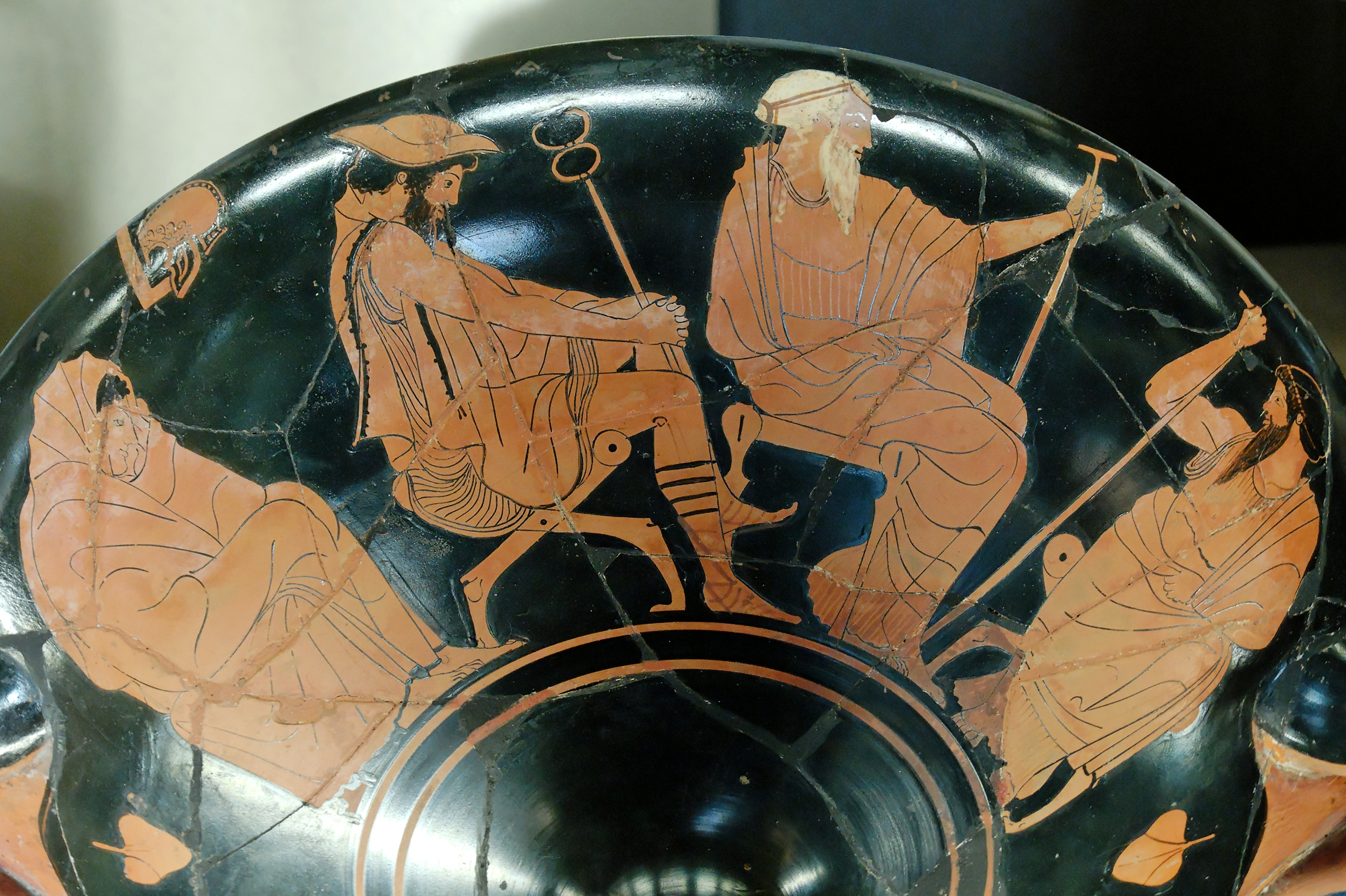
The embassy to Achilles, kylix by the Tarquinia Painter, Louvre Museum.

The Tarquinia Painter (fl. c. 470–460 BCE) was an ancient Attic vase painter working in red-figure technique during the early mid-5th century BCE. His artistic personality (for he never signed his work) has been extrapolated by John Beazley from his type-piece, Tarquinia RC 1121, Museo Nazionale Tarquiniese, illustrated in Corpus Vasorum Antiquorum II, plate 22.1.
