= Panther Painter =

Ancient Greek vase painter

The Panther Painter was a vase painter of the Attic black-figure style. He was probably active at the same time as the Nessos Painter, or shortly thereafter. Both shared a predilection for interlace patterns. The Panther Painter's vases have so far only been found in Attica, but outside Athens, at Vari. It is therefore assumed that he did not live and work in Athens, but only produced for a small local market in Attica. He mainly painted lekanis with animal friezes.

== Works ==
- Paris, Louvre CA 2990, Fragments of a lekanis

== Bibliography ==
- John Beazley: Attic Black-figure Vase-painters. Oxford 1956, p. 18.
- John Beazley: Paralipomena. Additions to Attic black-figure vase-painters and to Attic red-figure vase-painters, Oxford 1971, p. 11-12.
- John D. Beazley: The Development of Attic Black-figure, Rev. ed. Berkeley 1986, p.
- John Boardman: Schwarzfigurige Vasen aus Athen. Ein Handbuch, von Zabern, 4. edn, Mainz 1994 (Kulturgeschichte der Antiken Welt, Vol 1) ISBN 3-8053-0233-9, p. 21.
