= Three Line Group =

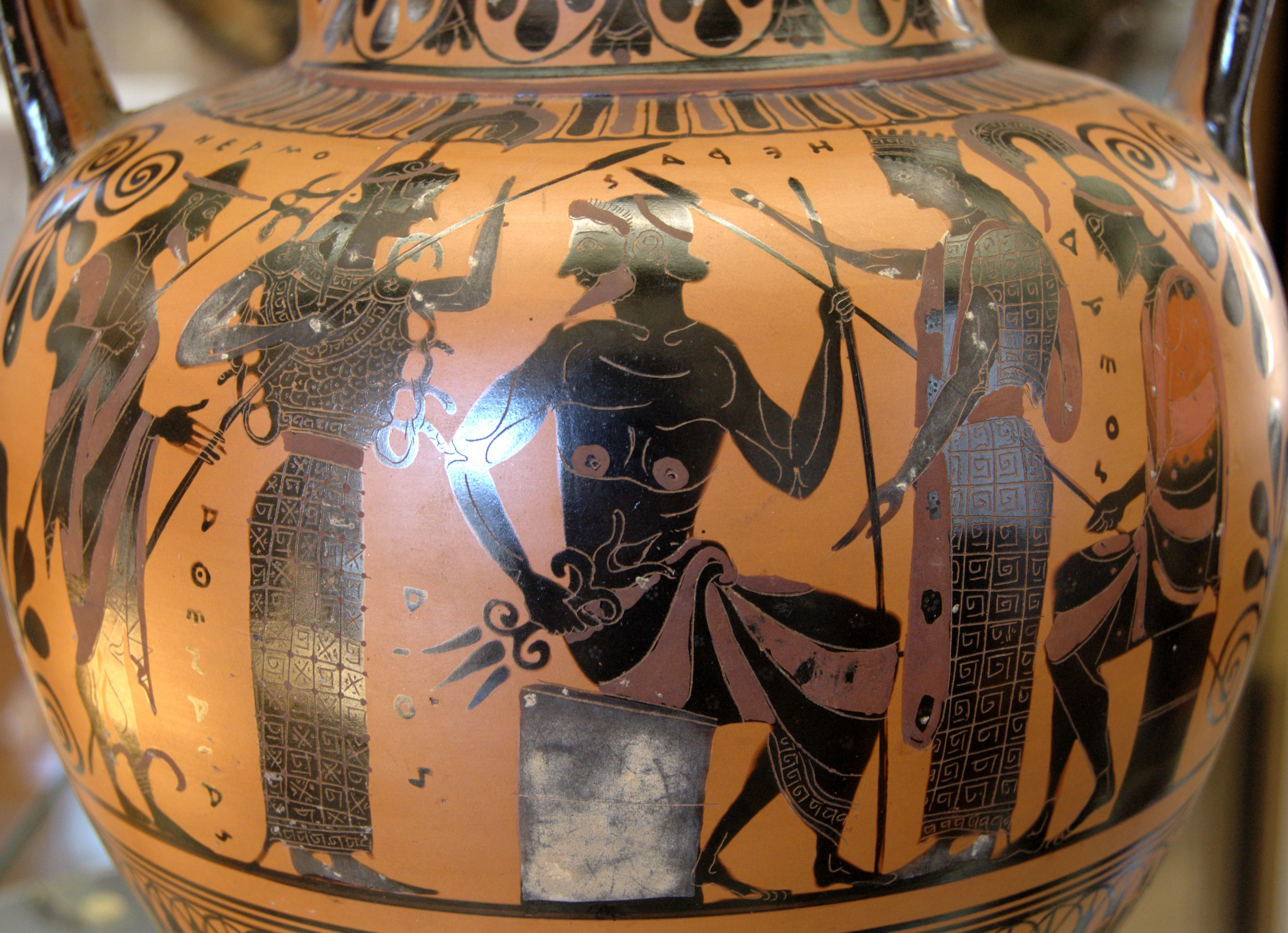
Hermes, Athena, Zeus, Hera and Ares. Paris: Louvre.

The term Three Line Group describes a group of Attic black-figure vase painters, as well as a type of vase. They belong to the last quarter of the sixth century BC.

The group's conventional name is based on its habit of separating the individual decorative stripes on small-format neck amphorae with three separating lines. The group produces work of increasingly worse quality during its period activity. Its decorations are rarely better than poor. In spite of the limited quality, their work reminded John Beazley of the Andokides Painter. The group's vases are often extensively inscribed. Apart from names of depicted figures, they can also bear kalos inscriptions for Onetorides or Hippokrates.

== Bibliography ==
- John Beazley: Attic Black-Figure Vase-Painters, Oxford 1956, p.
- John D. Beazley: Paralipomena. Additions to Attic black-figure vase-painters and to Attic red-figure vase-painters. Oxford 1971. p.
- John Boardman: Schwarzfigurige Vasen aus Athen. Ein Handbuch, Mainz 1977, ISBN 3-8053-0233-9, p. 123
