= Painter of the Berlin Dancing Girl =

Apulian vase painter (fl. 430–410 BC)

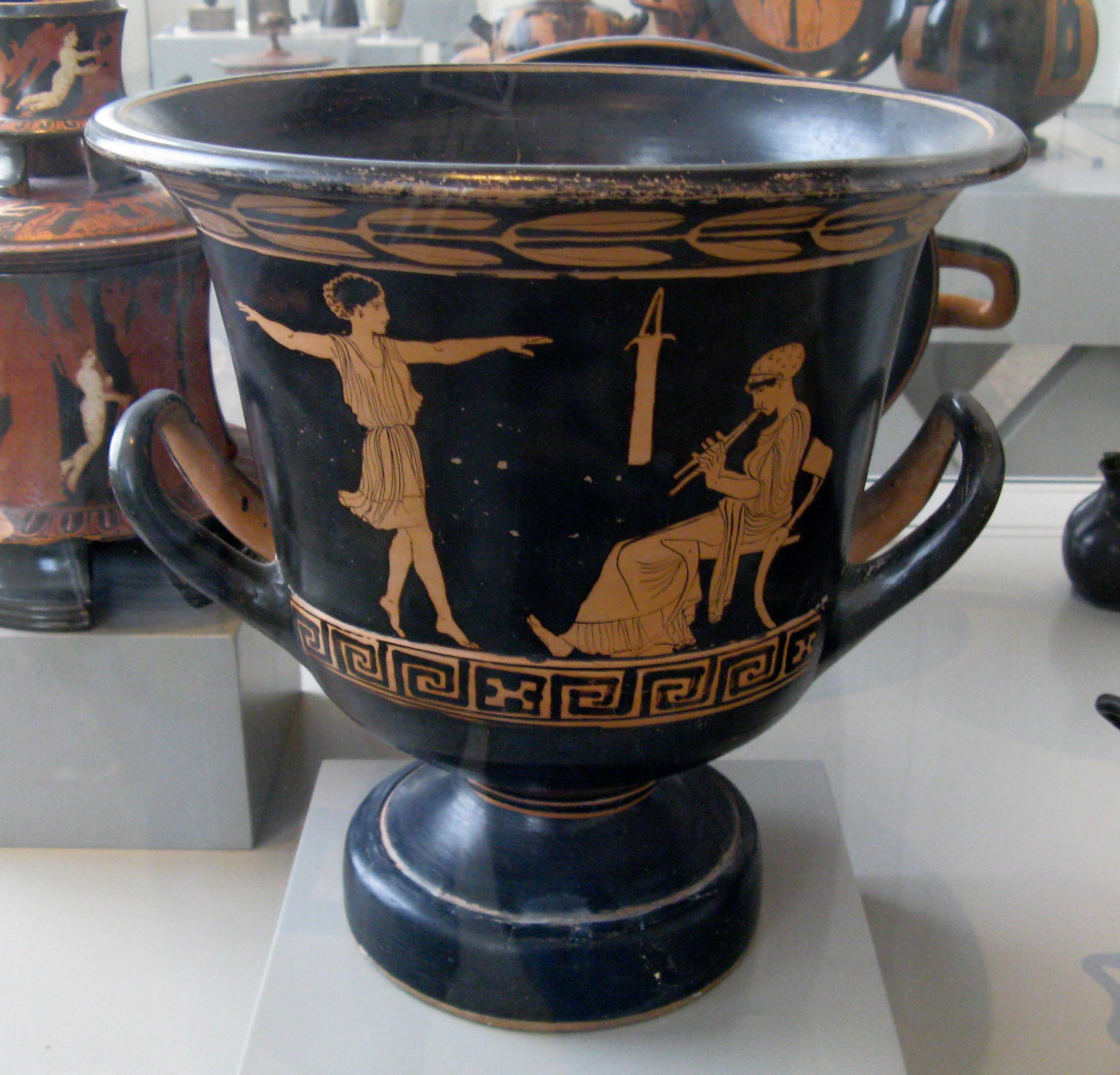
The painter's name vase

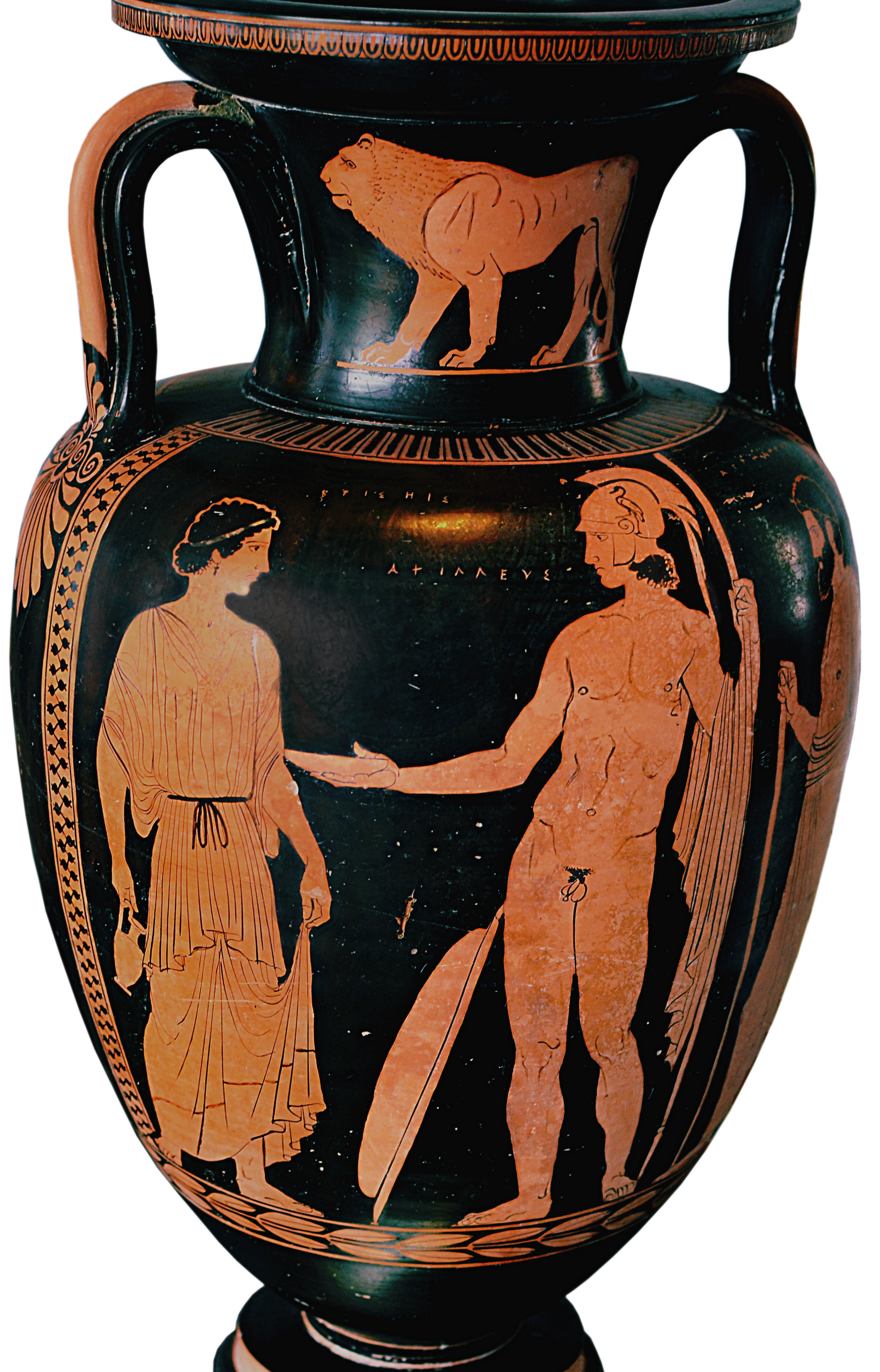
Briseis and Achilles on an amphora, Museo Provinciale Sigismondo Castromediano in Lecce, Italy

The Painter of the Berlin Dancing Girl was an Apulian red-figure vase painter, who was active between 430–410 BC. He was named after a calyx krater in the collection of the Antikensammlung Berlin, which depicts a girl dancing to the aulos played by a seated woman.

As one of the first South Italian red-figure painters, he must have been educated in an Attic workshop. His name vase shows influences from the work of the Phiale Painter, who worked in Attica. He and his followers most likely had their workshops in Taras, which is Taranto today.

== Works ==
Other works attributed to him include:

- A krater located in the Rhode Island School of Design Museum. A Centauromachy is shown on the vase with Theseus or Herakles battling two centaurs.
- An amphora in the Museo Provinciale Sigismondo Castromediano in Lecce, Italy. It depicts Briseis and Achilles.
- The sole column crater attributed to this painter is in the collection of the Museo Camillo Leone in Vercelli, Italy. It shows the pursuit of Troilus by Achilles and is dated to 420–410 BC.
- A pelike in the National Gallery of Victoria showing an Amazonomachy scene.
