= Bryn Mawr Painter =

Ancient Greek vase painter

The Bryn Mawr Painter is the name given to an Attic Greek red-figure vase painter, active in the late Archaic period (c. 500 – 480 BCE).

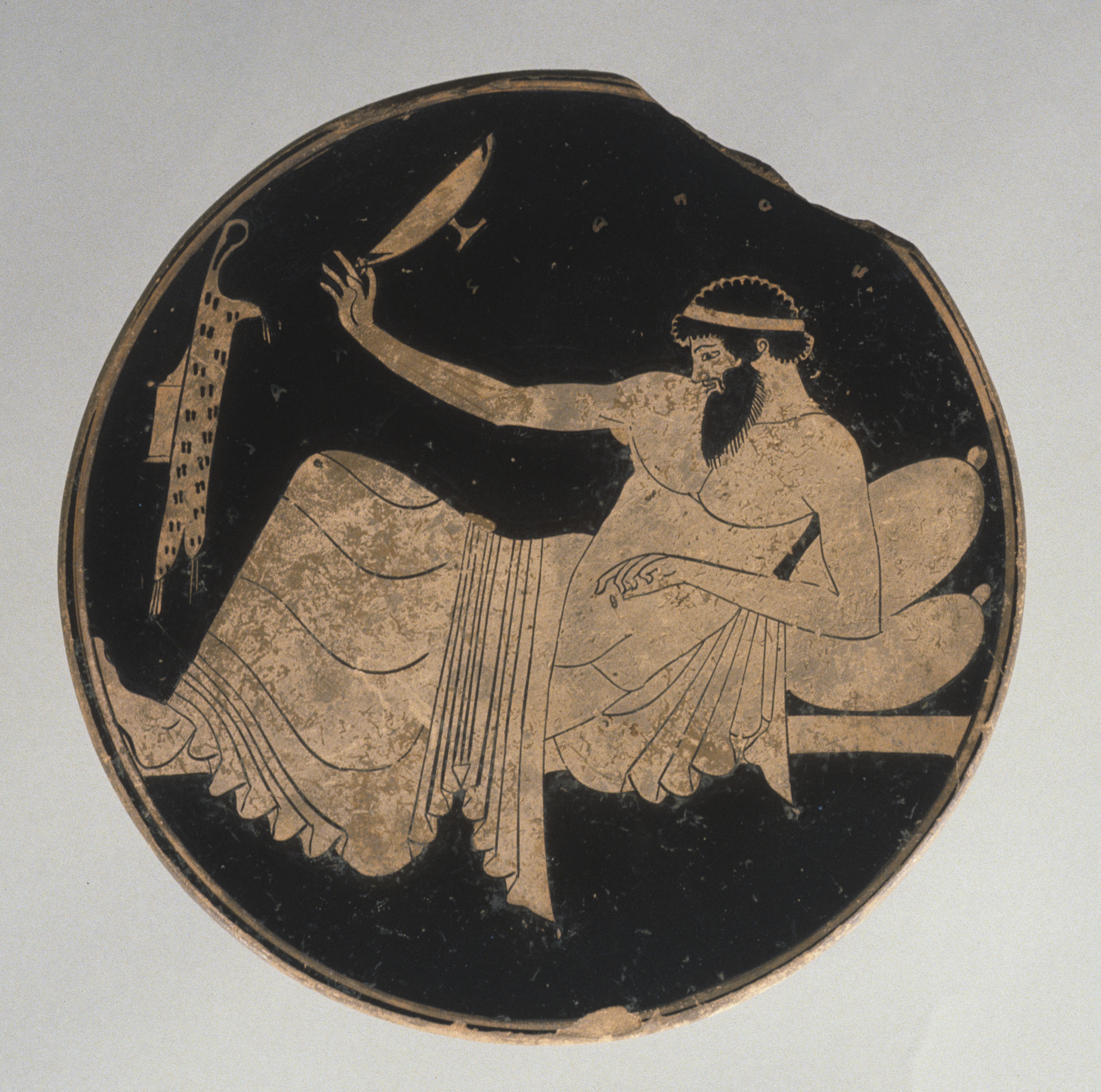
Red-figured plate by the Bryn Mawr Painter on which a bearded symposiast plays kottabos.

== Name artefact ==
The Bryn Mawr Painter was named by Sir John Beazley for a plate in the Bryn Mawr College Art and Artifact Collections (the Bryn Mawr Painter's namepiece).

Interior: A reclining male figure, draped from the waist down, leans against a doubled-over bolster. With the forefinger of his outstretched right hand, he holds a kylix by the handle. A wreath, now so worn as to be all but invisible, dangles from his left hand. Hanging on the wall at his feet is a flute case of spotted animal skin. The figure is a participant in a Greek symposium (drinking party) and is shown playing the popular game of kottabos, in which contestants attempted to hit various types of targets with wine dregs flung from the bottom of a kylix. A kalos inscription reading "HO PAIS KALOS" ("the boy is beautiful") appears above the head and knee of the symposiast.

Exterior: Reserved except for black glaze on the base ring and in a wide circular band in the center of the plate.

== Sources ==
- TriArte: Art & Artifacts Database – The Bryn Mawr Painter
- Joseph Clark Hoppin. A Handbook of Attic Red-Figured Vases. Cambridge, Massachusetts, 1919. p. 1 & 280, Fig. 61.
