= Painter of the Vatican Mourner =

Attic black-figure vase painter

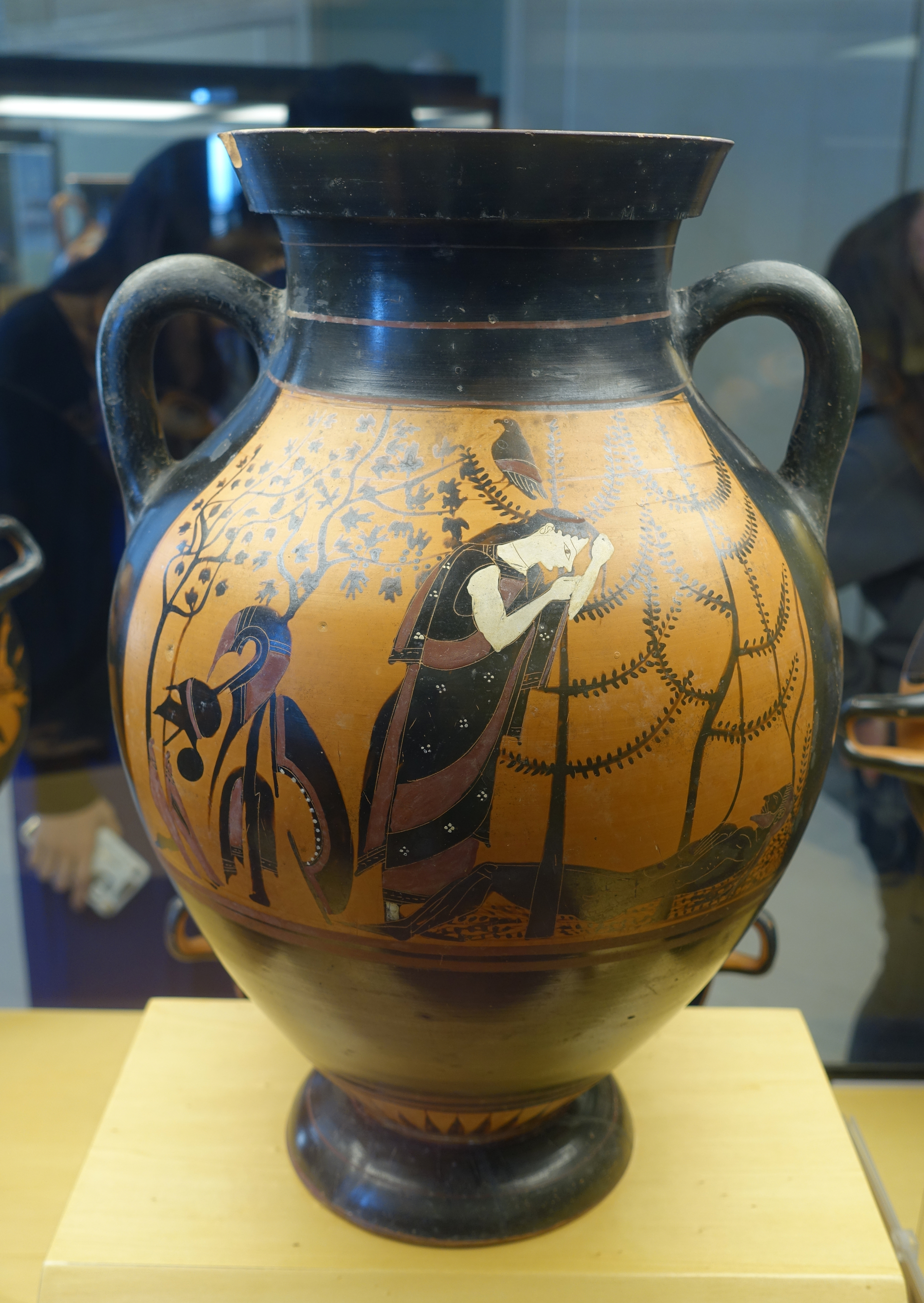
Name vase for the Painter of the Vatican Mourner

The Painter of the Vatican Mourner was an Attic black-figure vase painter, active in the middle of the sixth century BC and closely connected with the artists of Group E. His real name is not known. His name vase is in the Vatican Museum and depicts a mourning woman standing before the nude body of a dead man on a bed of straw. There is no consensus on the interpretation of the scene. Eos and Sarpedon have been suggested, as have Oinone and Paris. John Boardman describes him as a thoughtful but sometimes imprecise artist.

== Bibliography ==
- John Beazley: Attic Black-Figure Vase-Painters, Oxford 1956, p. 140
- John Boardman: Schwarzfigurige Vasen aus Athen. Ein Handbuch, Mainz 1977, ISBN 3-8053-0233-9, p. 70
