= Ptoon Painter =

Unidentified ancient Greek vase painter

The Ptoon Painter was an ancient Greek vase painter of black-figure style active in Athens in the middle third of the 6th century BC. His real name is unknown.

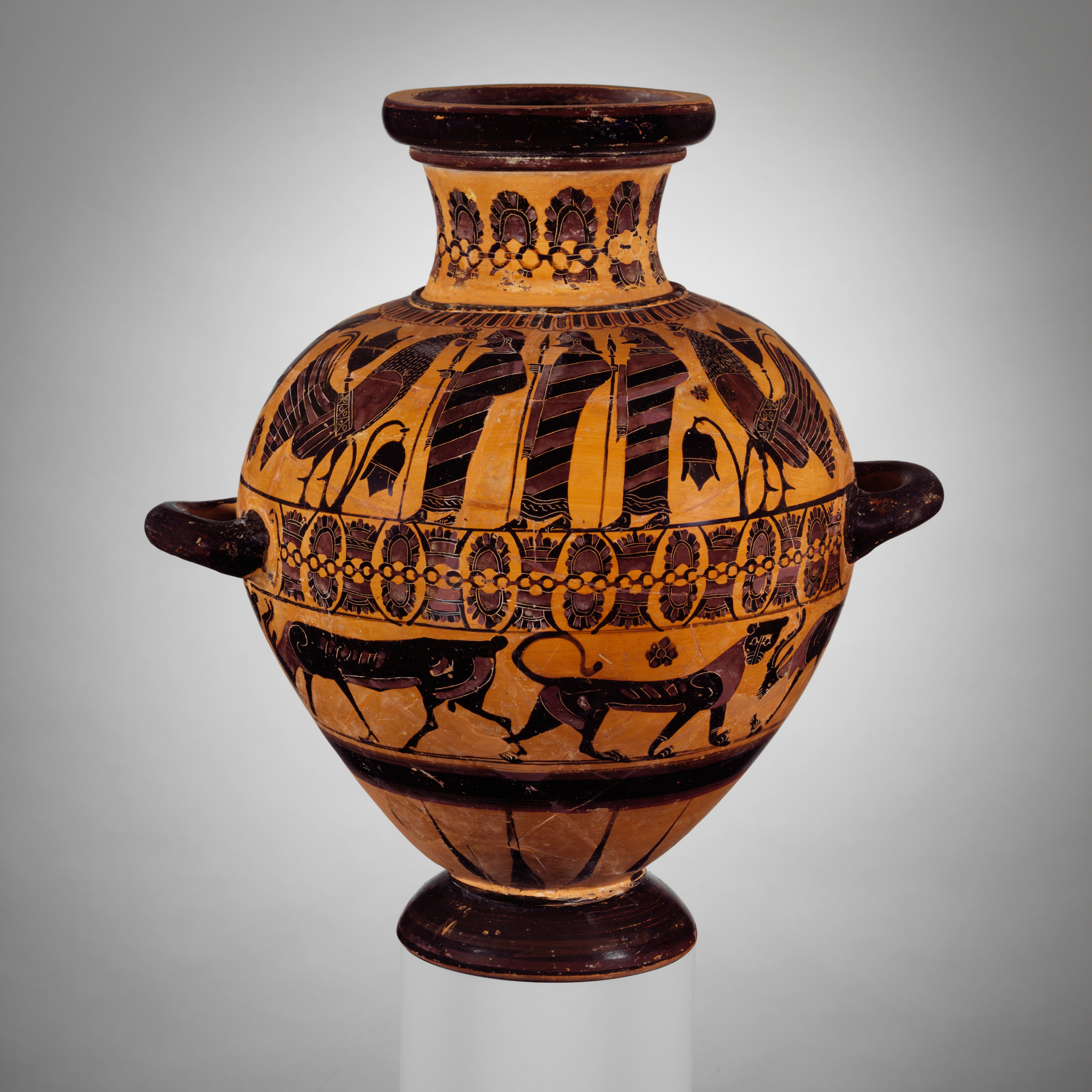
Terracotta hydria (water jar) MET DP158159

The Ptoon Painter predominantly painted ovoid neck amphorae, spherical '’hydriai’’, and Siana cups. His most distinguishing features are figural palmettes and striking black-and-red patterns on the wings of birds. Along with the Camtar Painter, he was one of the last painters to paint animal friezes. His work is considered of mediocre quality. He often used dotted rosettes for the backgrounds, a feature generally out of use at the time of his activity. The late date of his works is attested by certain details of his plant motifs and figures, which resemble the work of Lydos. His most famous work is the Hearst Hydria, on display in New York City.

== Bibliography ==
- John D. Beazley: Attic Black-figure Vase-painters. Oxford 1956, p. 83-84.
- John Boardman: Schwarzfigurige Vasen aus Athen. Ein Handbuch, von Zabern, Mainz 1977 (Kulturgeschichte der Antiken Welt, Vol 1) ISBN 3-8053-0233-9, p. 39.
