= Lion Painter =

Ancient Greek vase painter

The Lion Painter was one of the earliest Athenian black-figure vase painters. He was active between 630 and 600 BC.

He was a contemporary of the Nessos Painter, but remained a less significant influence, in spite of his artistic achievements. All vases ascribed to him depict lions. His work is only known from a few fragments, which are, however, consistently of very high quality. The bald lion on his name vase appears to look sorrowful.

== Works ==
- Athen, National Museum: Neck amphora 16392, 16393 and 16394
- Athen, Vlasto collection: Fragment of a neck amphora
- New York, Metropolitan Museum: Fragment 38.11.10

== Bibliography ==
- John D. Beazley: Attic Black-figure Vase-painters. Oxford 1956, p. 2.
- John Boardman: Schwarzfigurige Vasen aus Athen. Ein Handbuch, von Zabern, 4. edn, Mainz 1994 (Kulturgeschichte der Antiken Welt, Vol) ISBN 3-8053-0233-9, p. 18.
