= Darrell A. Amyx =

American classical archaeologist (1911–1997)

Darrell Arlynn Amyx (2 April 1911 – 10 January 1997) was an American classical archaeologist. His principal field of study was the archaic pottery of Corinth. Complementing the pioneering work of John Beazley and Humfry Payne, Amyx applied stylistic analysis to the work of previously unnamed and unstudied Corinthian painters, discerning many otherwise forgotten "hands".

Born in Exeter, California, Amyx studied classics at Stanford University, where he earned a Bachelor of Arts degree in 1930. He pursued further studies at the University of California, Berkeley; earning first a master's degree in Latin in 1932 and later a Ph.D. in Latin and classical archaeology in 1937. He then studied in Greece as a Fulbright Scholar. He later was the recipient of two Guggenheim Fellowships and four grants from the American Council of Learned Societies. In 1946 he joined the faculty at Berkeley where he taught until his retirement in 1978. In addition to teaching classes at Berkeley he served variously as the art department's chair, assistant dean of the College of Letters and Science, and curator of classical art in the University Art Museum as well as the Lowie Museum of Anthropology. He died after a long illness in 1997 at the age of 85.

== Published works ==
- An Amphora with A Price Inscription in the Hearst Collection at San Simeon. Berkeley 1941
- Echoes from Olympus: Reflections of Divinity into Small Scale Classical art. Berkeley 1974 (with Barbara A. Forbes (ed.))
- Archaic Corinthian Pottery and the Anaploga Well. Princeton, NJ 1975, ISBN 0-87661-072-6 (with Patricia Lawrence)
- Corinthian Vase Painting of the Archaic Period. 3 vols. Berkeley 1988, ISBN 0-520-03166-0
- Studies in Archaic Corinthian Vase Painting. Princeton, NJ 1996, ISBN 0-87661-528-0 (with Patricia Lawrence)

== Secondary literature ==
- Mario A. Del Chiaro (ed.): Corinthiaca. Studies in honor of Darrell A. Amyx, Columbia, Missouri 1986, ISBN 0-8262-0617-4 (with bibliography).
- Evelyn E. Bell, Barbara A. Forbes: "Darrell Arlynn Amyx, 1911–1997". In American Journal of Archaeology 102 (1998) 179–180.
- Evelyn E. Bell, Barbara A. Forbes: "Darrell A. Amyx". In Gnomon 70 (1998) 575–576.
