= Thomas Mannack =

German classical archaeologist

- Born: 1958 (age 67–68)
- Occupation: German classical archaeologist

Thomas Mannack (born in 1958) is a German classical archaeologist.

Mannack obtained his doctorate in 1992 with Konrad Schauenburg at the University of Kiel. The thema of his dissertation was Beazleys spätere und späteste Manieristen. The thesis was later published in English by Oxford University Press. He is a specialist in the field of ancient ceramics. He is in charge of the Beazley Archive database and teaches classical iconography at the University of Oxford.

Mannack is chair of the British Corpus Vasorum Antiquorum project conducted by the British Academy, and has coauthored CVA volumes on collections of Greek Vases in Winchester College, and Harrow School.

== Writings ==
- The Late Mannerists in Athenian Vase Painting. Oxford University Press, Oxford, 2001 (English version of the dissertation)
- Griechische Vasenmalerei. Eine Einführung. Thesis, Stuttgart 2002. ISBN 3-8062-1743-2, reviewed and bibliographically updated edition of Von Zabern, Darmstadt 2012. ISBN 978-3-8053-4462-3
