= Revellers =

Revellers or Revelers may refer to:

- The poem “The Revellers” by Felicia Hemans, published in different versions 1824 and 1825
- Twelfth Night Revelers, a New Orleans Carnival Krewe, founded in 1870
- The Leake County Revelers, a country music string band, popular in the 1920s and 1930s
- The Revelers, an American quintet, popular in the late 1920s and early 1930s
- Mobile Revelers, an NBDL team based in Mobile, Alabama from 2001 to 2003
- The Revelers (Louisiana), a Louisiana music group, active since 2010

Works of art named by others:

- The Revellers Vase, a Greek vase originating from the Archaic period
- Shrovetide Revellers, a painting by the Dutch Golden Age painter Frans Hals from around 1616–17.
