= Revellers Vase =

Attic red-figure amphora from c. 510 BCE

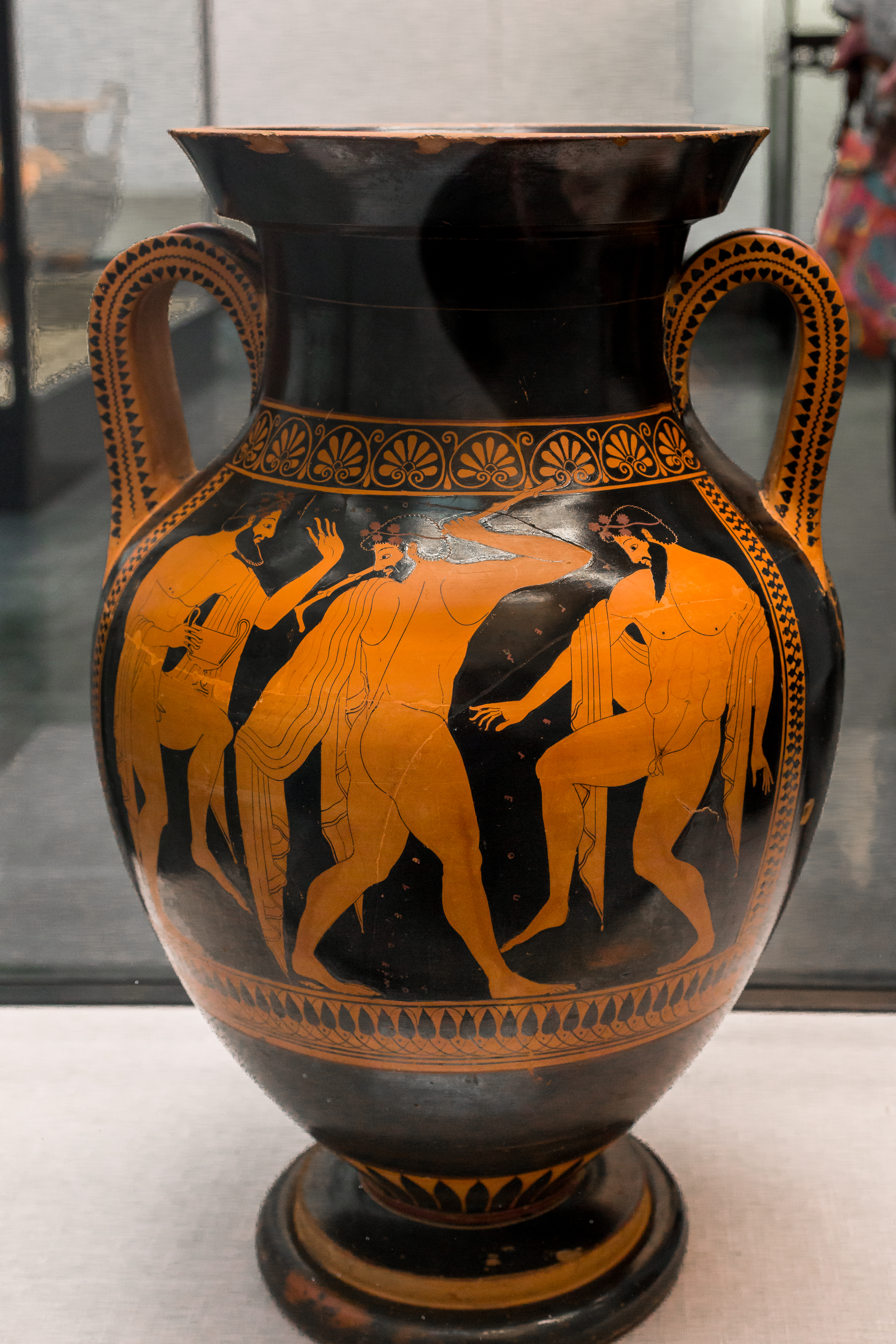
One side of the amphora: three bearded men dance.

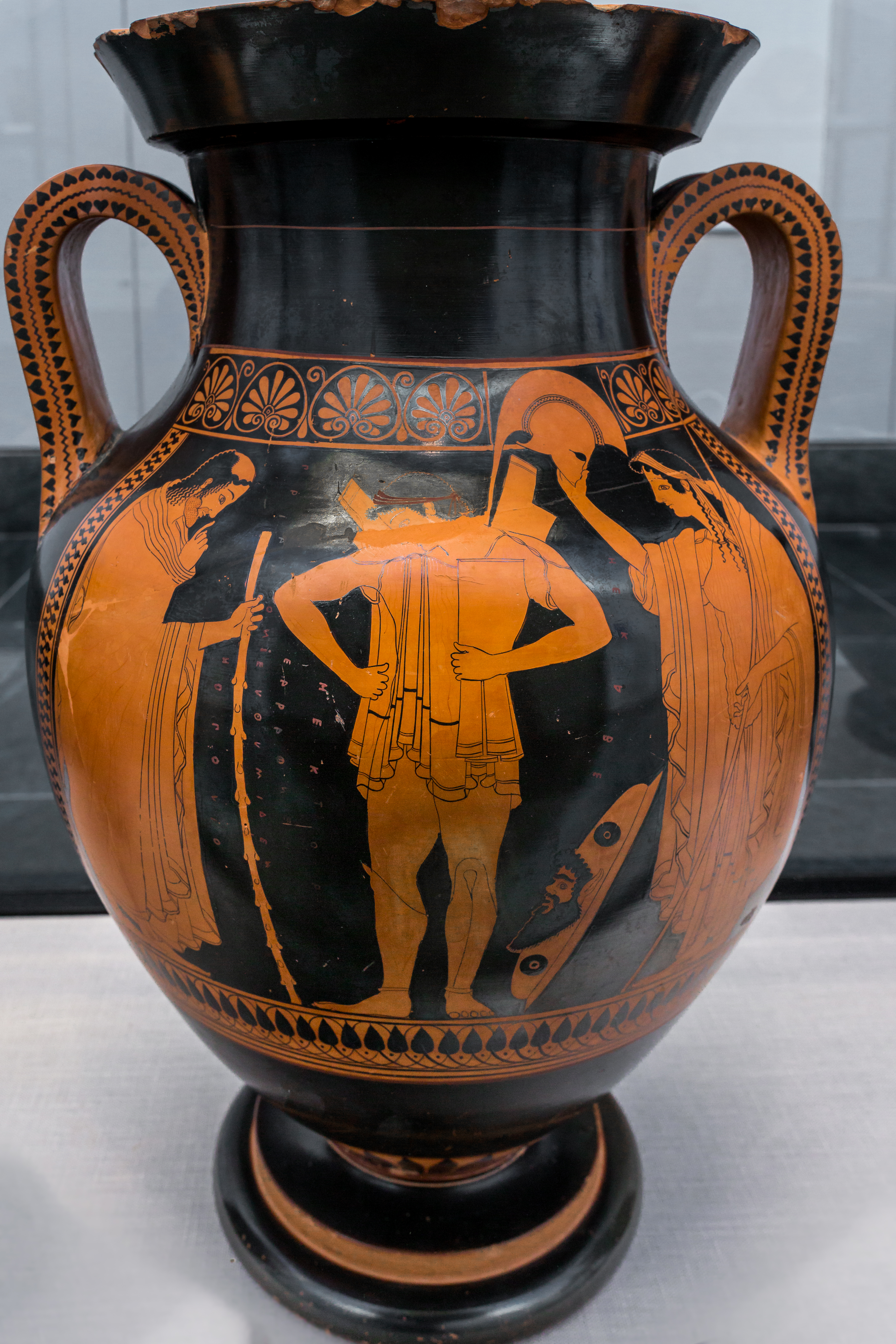
The other side: Hector dons his armour as his parents Priam and Hecuba watch.

The Revellers Vase is a Greek vase originating from the Archaic period. It was made around 510 BCE in the red-figure pottery style and the painting is attributed to Euthymides. The vase is an amphora (a type of vessel normally used for storage), painted with two scenes: one depicts three nude partygoers, and the other the Trojan hero Hector arming for battle. It is an example of the work of the Pioneer Group, which employed the red-figure style with an interest in human anatomy and the use of dynamic, space-filling poses.

The work represents an early use of foreshortening and three-quarter views of figures in Greek vase-painting, breaking with earlier conventions of employing profile and frontal views. It includes an inscription, "As never Euphronios" (ὡς οὐδέποτε Εὐφρόνιος; hos oudepote Euphronios), written by the painter: this is generally taken as a taunt directed at Euthymides's contemporary painter, Euphronios. The vase was excavated in 1829 by Lucien Bonaparte from the Tomb of the Cuccumella, an Etruscan tomb in Vulci, Italy, and is currently held in the Staatliche Antikensammlungen in Munich, Germany.

== History ==
The Revellers Vase is attributed to the Athenian painter Euthymides, active during the Archaic period from c. 515 – c. 500 BCE. It is approximately 60 centimetres (24 in) in height, and is considered to have been executed around 510 BCE. Euthymides, along with other painters like Euphronios and Phintias, is considered to belong to the Pioneer Group, so named for their work with the newly invented red-figure style, in which the dark slip painted onto the vase was applied to the background, leaving the foreground rendered by the negative space in the natural colour of the clay. This contrasted with the earlier black-figure technique, where the slip was used to paint the figures, and small details picked out by scratching it away. The work of the Pioneer Group was characterised by its interest in human anatomy and the use of dynamic, space-filling poses.

The vase was discovered in Vulci, then part of the Papal States, in Italy. It was excavated by Lucien Bonaparte (the brother of Napoleon Bonaparte), who excavated more than 3,000 Attic vases from Etruscan tombs on his estate near Vulci from 1828. Bonaparte found the vase in the sixth-century-BCE Tomb of the Cuccumella in March 1829. (Note: Bonaparte 1830, p. 121. For the date of the tomb, see Haynes 2000, p. 152.) It is currently held by the Staatliche Antikensammlungen in Munich, Germany, where it has an inventory number of 2307. It has a number of 26,1 in the ARV^{2} indexing system developed by John Beazley, and is numbered 200160 in the Beazley Archive Pottery Database.

== Description ==
The vase is a Type A amphora, a vase-form favored by Euthymides. Two-handled amphorae, like the Revellers Vase, were typically used for the storage of wine, oil and other liquids and solids. One side of the vase shows three mostly nude male dancers (komasts) engaged in a komos, a wild and usually drunken ritual dance in honour of the god Dionysos, perhaps in the aftermath of an all-male drinking party known as a symposium. The left-most reveller holds a kantharos, a Greek drinking vessel. Two of the komasts are named as Eudemos and Teles, while the left-hand figure is labelled komarkhos, meaning "leader of the dance". All three wear floral crowns.

The vase is decorated with floral and geometric motifs on the handles and at the base, which frame the main scenes. On the opposite side to the revellers, the Trojan prince Hector is shown donning his armour before combat. He is watched by his parents, Priam and Hecuba. Hector, depicted frontally, wears a chiton (a form of tunic fastened at the shoulder), greaves and a cuirass, which he adjusts. A shield, decorated with the head of a faun, stands at his feet. Hecuba wears a chiton, a wreath and an epiblema-veil: the latter garment was traditionally associated with marriage, but often denoted mythological queens in vase-painting. She hands Hector his helmet and spear, and parts of her breast and leg can be seen through her clothing. There is a simple scratched graffito on the bottom of the foot. All of the figures in both scenes are labelled; these names, along with Hector's headband and some stripes on the vase, are executed in purple slip. Apart from Priam, all of the figures have the detail of their hair indicated by incision into the slip.

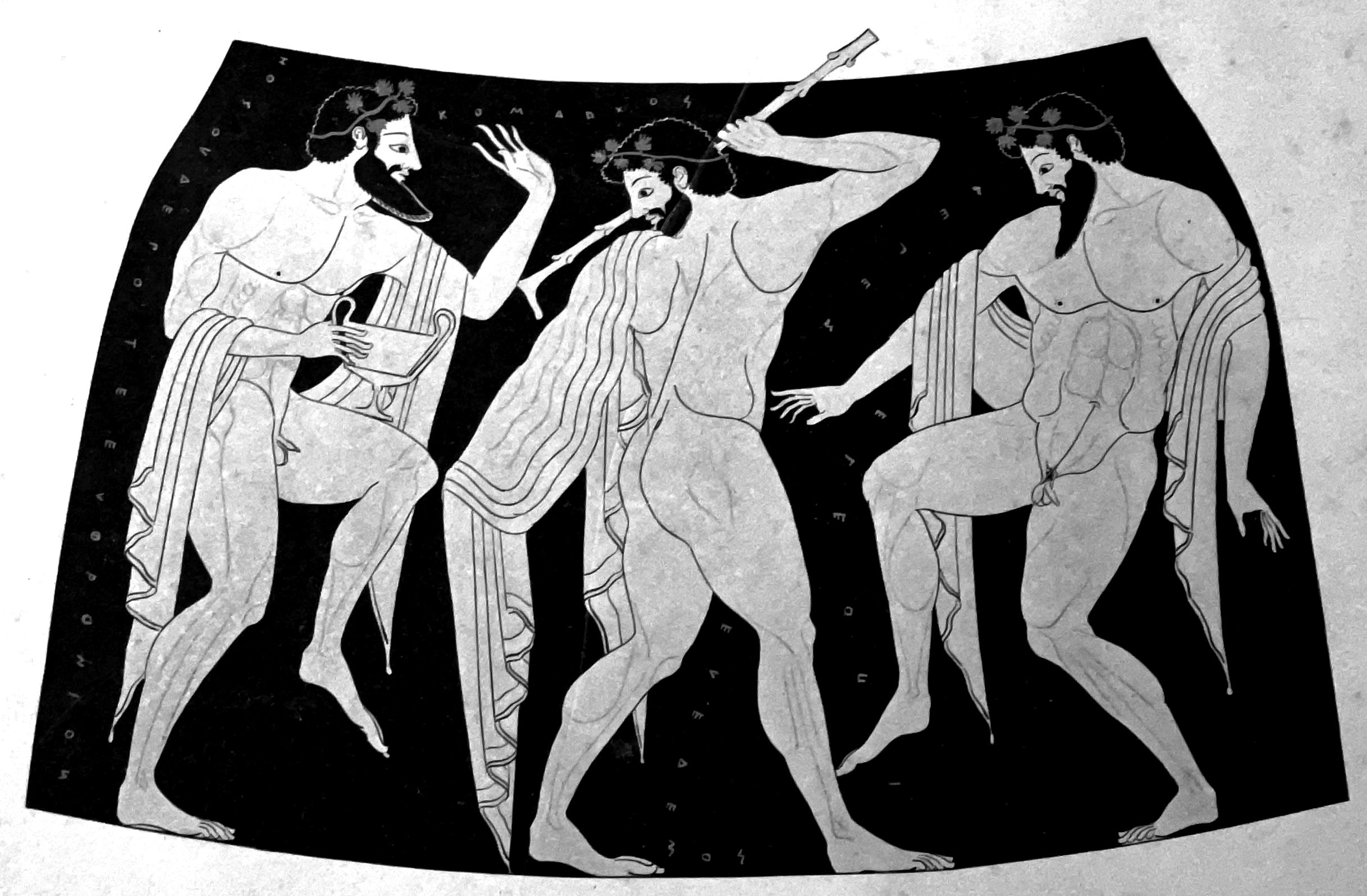
Drawing of the revellers scene by Karl Reichhold, showing the "As never Euphronios!" inscription written from top to bottom at far left

The vase includes an inscription, written by Euthymides in purple slip, along the left edge of the image of the komasts: "As never Euphronios" (ὡς οὐδέποτε Εὐφρόνιος; hos oudepote Euphronios). Euphronios was Euthymides's contemporary and rival, (Note: The art historian Nigel Spivey has conjectured that Euthymides may have been Euphronios's elder brother.) and both painters were familiar with each other's work. The inscription is generally interpreted as a taunt or challenge to Euphronios, and as a claim that he could never equal the painting of the dancers. The art historian Gisela Richter specifically interpreted the inscription as a reference to Euthymides's use of three-quarter views, in contrast with the front-on or side-on perspective universal in Euphronios's work. However, it has also been interpreted as more closely linked with the image, claiming instead that Euphronios had never taken part in a komos, perhaps because this was an aristocratic activity and Euphronios was of comparatively low social origin. The classicist Jenifer Neils states that the inscription has sometimes been interpreted as a show of "senile jealousy".

== Artistic importance ==
Breaking with the traditionally rigid frontal postures of contemporary Archaic statues and paintings, the revellers are depicted in dynamic, overlapping postures. The art historian Jeffrey M. Hurwit has called the Revellers Vase the most important of Euthymides's six signed painted works. (Note: Euthymides signed a further two vases as potter.) Another art historian, Mary B. Moore, has emphasised the pathos of the image of Hector, suggesting that the intensity of his parents' gaze towards him indicates their knowledge that he will die in the Trojan War, and linked the vase with other contemporary works that use the heroes of the Trojan Cycle as vehicles for sympathy and tragedy.

== Bibliography ==
- Barringer, Judith M. (2015). The Art and Archaeology of Ancient Greece. Cambridge University Press. ISBN 978-1-139-04741-8.
- Bonaparte, Lucien (1830). Muséum étrusque de Lucien Bonaparte, prince de Canino, fouilles de 1828 à 1829 : vases peints avec inscriptions [Etruscan Museum of Lucien Bonaparte, Prince of Canino, Excavations of 1828 to 1829: Painted Vases with Inscriptions] (in French). Viterbe: Camille Tosoni. OCLC 318339585.
- Campbell, Gordon, ed. (2007). "Euthymides". The Grove Encyclopaedia of Classical Art and Architecture. Oxford University Press. pp. 458–459. ISBN 978-0-19-530082-6.
- Haynes, Sibyl (2000). Etruscan Civilization: A Cultural History. Malibu, California: J. Paul Getty Museum. ISBN 0-89236-600-1.
- Hedreen, Guy (2016). The Image of the Artist in Archaic and Classical Greece: Art, Poetry, and Subjectivity. Cambridge University Press. ISBN 978-1-107-11825-6.
- Hoppin, Joseph Clark (1917). Euthymides and His Fellows. Cambridge, Massachusetts: Harvard University Press. OCLC 1045347251.
- Hoppin, Joseph Clark (1919). A Handbook of Attic Red-Figured Vases, Signed by or Attributed to the Various Masters of the Sixth and Fifth Centuries BC. Vol. 1. Cambridge, Massachusetts: Harvard University Press. doi:10.11588/DIGLIT.49347.
- Hurwit, Jeffrey M. (2015). Artists and Signatures in Ancient Greece. Cambridge University Press. ISBN 978-1-107-10571-3.
- Kottaridi, Angeliki (2020). Queens, Priestesses, Goddesses: From Macedonia to the World. Translated by Wardle, Nicola. Athens: Eurasia Publications. OL 57439905M.
- Mannack, Thomas (2018). "Greek Decorated Pottery I: Athenian Vase-Painting". In Plantzos, Dimitris; Smith, Tyler Jo (eds.). A Companion to Greek Art. Chichester: Wiley–Blackwell. pp. 39–61. ISBN 978-1-119-26681-5.
- Moore, Mary B. (2000). "The Berlin Painter and Troy". Greek Vases in the J. Paul Getty Museum (PDF). Vol. 6. Malibu, California: J. Paul Getty Museum. pp. 159–188. ISBN 0-89236-058-5.
- Neer, Richard T. (2002). Style and Politics in Athenian Vase-Painting: The Craft of Democracy, ca. 530–460 BCE. Cambridge University Press. ISBN 0-521-79111-1 – via Internet Archive.
- Neils, Jenifer (2017). "Portrait of an Artist: Euthymides, Son of Pollias". In Seaman, Kirsten; Schultz, Peter (eds.). Artists and Artistic Production in Ancient Greece. Cambridge University Press. pp. 23–36. doi:10.1017/9781139696869.004. ISBN 978-1-139-69686-9.
- Nørskov, Vinnie (2009). "The Affairs of Lucien Bonaparte and the Impact on the Study of Greek Vases". In Nørskov, Vinnie; Hannestad, Lise; Isler-Keréyni, Cornelia; Lewis, Sian (eds.). The World of Greek Vases. Analecta Romana Instituti Danici – Supplementa. Vol. 41. Rome: Edizioni Quasar di Severino Tognon. pp. 63–76. ISBN 978-88-7140-420-2 – via Academia.edu.
- Richter, Gisela (1958). Attic Red-Figured Vases: A Survey (Revised ed.). New Haven: Yale University Press. OCLC 906216 – via Internet Archive.
- Robertson, Martin (1981). A Shorter History of Greek Art. Cambridge University Press. OCLC 1151401411 – via Internet Archive.
- Shapiro, H. A. (1983). "Epilykos Kalos". Hesperia. 52 (3): 305–310. doi:10.2307/148007. JSTOR 148007.
- Spivey, Nigel (2019). The Sarpedon Krater: The Life and Afterlife of a Greek Vase. University of Chicago Press. ISBN 978-0-226-66659-4.
- Woodford, Susan (1993). The Trojan War in Ancient Art. New York: Cornell University Press. ISBN 0-8014-8164-3.
