= Euthymides =

Late 6th century BCE Athenian potter and painter

- Εὐθυμίδης
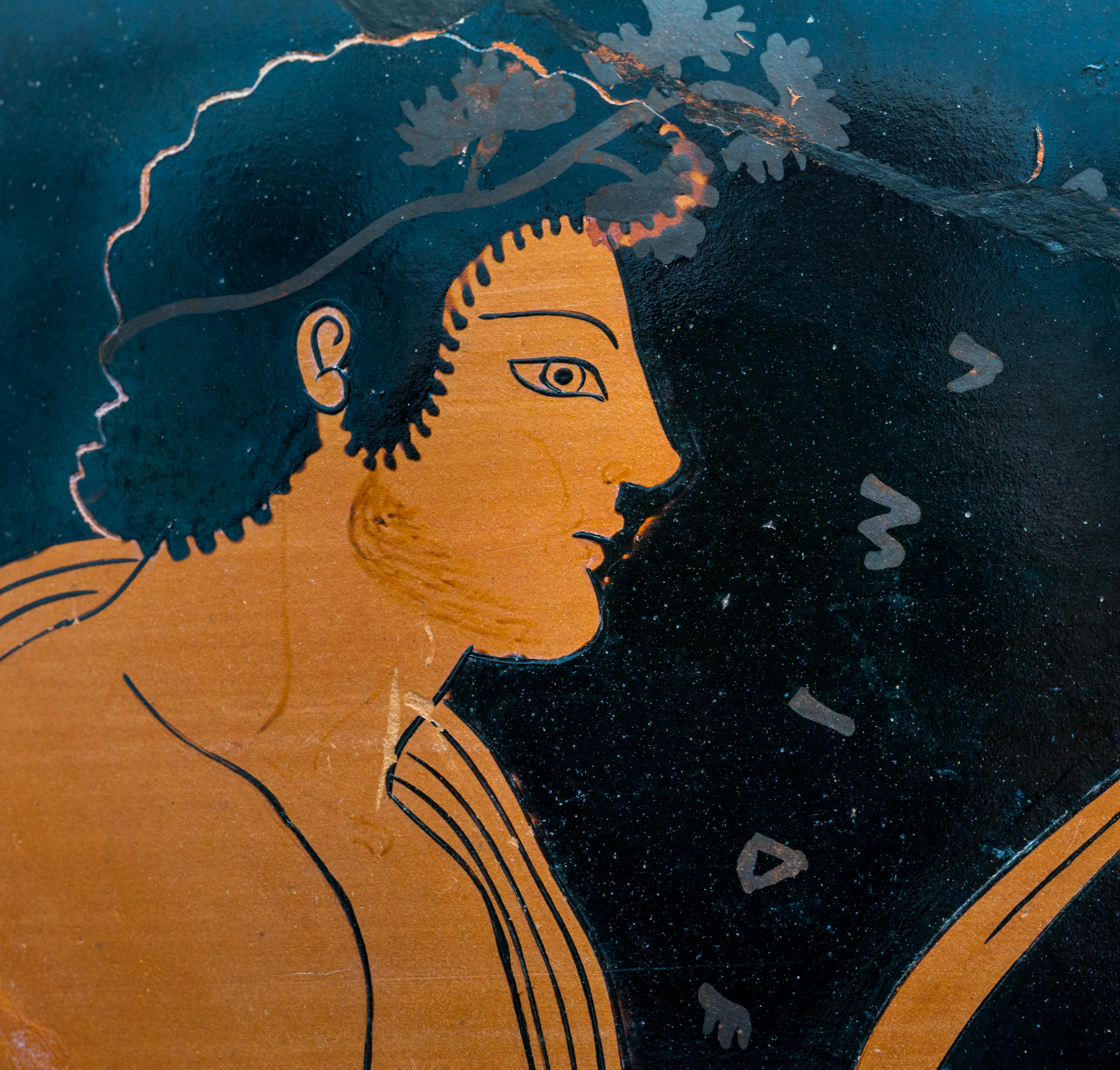
- As portrayed by his contemporary Phintias, c. 510 – c. 505 BCE
- Citizenship: Athenian
- Occupations: Painter; Potter
- Years active: c. 515 – c. 500 BCE
- Notable work: Revellers Vase
- Movement: Pioneer Group

Euthymides (Ancient Greek: Εὐθυμίδης; fl. c. 515 – c. 500 BCE) was an ancient Athenian potter and painter of vases. He was a member of the art movement later known as the Pioneer Group for their exploration of the new decorative style known as red-figure pottery. His works are known for their innovative use of foreshortening, and include the Revellers Vase, inscribed with a taunting message addressed to his fellow painter and rival Euphronios.

Euthymides's father was named Pollias, and may have been a noted Athenian sculptor by the same name. He was closely connected to the other artists of the Pioneer Group, including Euphronios and Phintias, whose work was characterised by a detailed study of anatomy and the use of dynamic poses for human figures. He signed eight vessels which survive, identifying himself both as a potter and as a painter, and painted vases in a variety of shapes. He may have taught or influenced other vase painters, such as his fellow Pioneer Smikros, the Berlin Painter, and the Kleophrades Painter.

== Background ==
Euthymides was active as an artist between around 515 and 500 BCE. He signed three of his vases with his patronymic, showing that his father was named Pollias. Many of the fathers whose names were signed by Athenian vase painters were themselves artists, and it is sometimes argued that signing a patronymic implied that the father was also an artist or the signing artist's teacher. Jenifer Neils identifies Euthymides's father with the sculptor named Pollias, who was a noted artist in the late sixth century, dedicated several sculptures on the Acropolis, and may have been the author of an artistic treatise. (Note: Jeffrey Hurwit suggests that Euthymides may also have been a sculptor.) This would have made Euthymides of a higher social standing than most Athenian potters. Nigel Spivey has conjectured that Euthymides may have been the elder brother of Euphronios, also a vase painter. Martin Robertson, in contrast, suggests that Euthymides may have been a younger apprentice of Euphronios.

== Artistic career ==
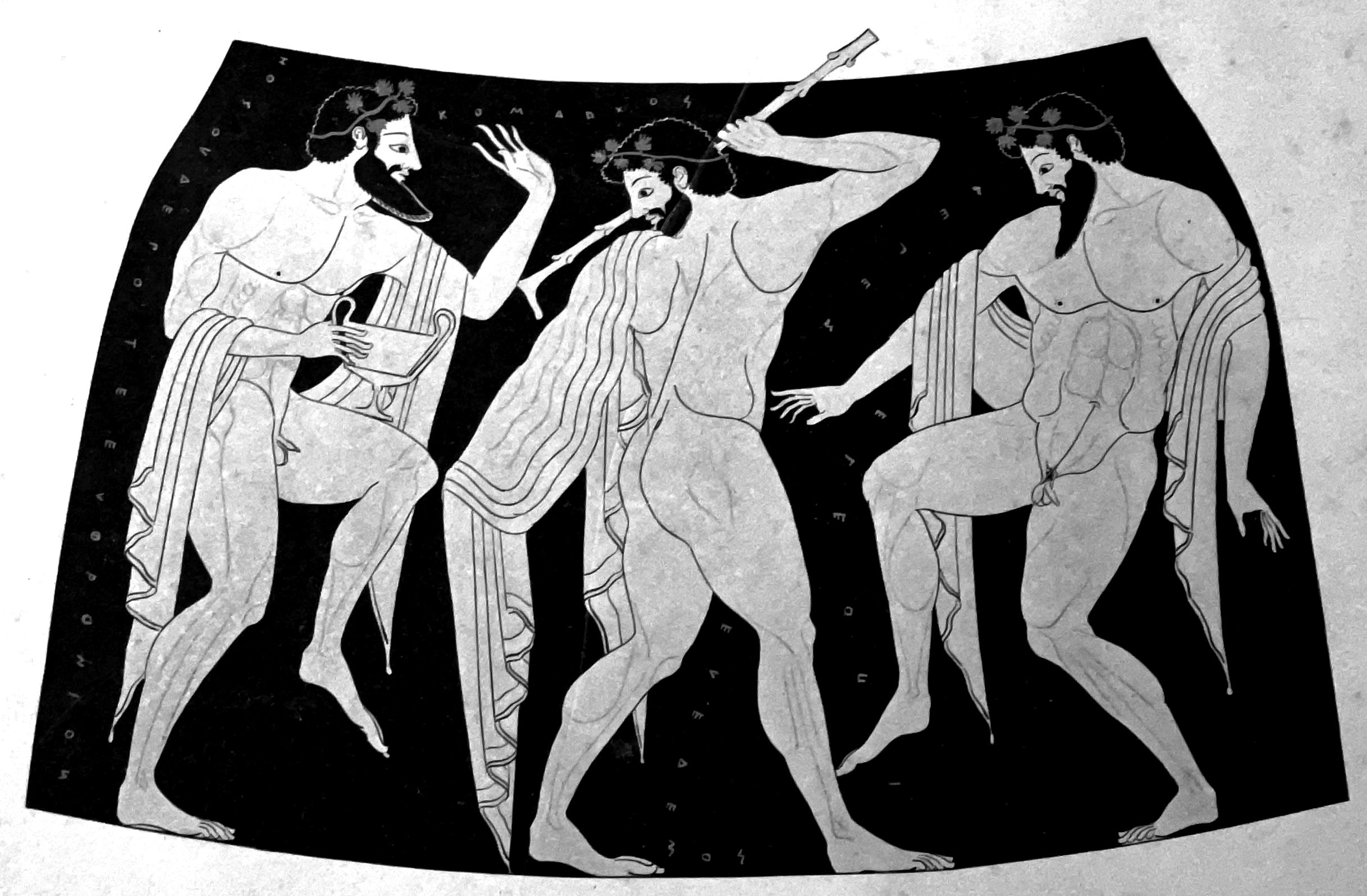
The dancers on the Revellers Vase: "as never Euphronios!" (ΗΟΣ ΟΥΔΕΠΟΤΕ ΕΥΦΡΟΝΙΟΣ) can be read down the left-hand side

Euthymides, along with other painters like Euphronios and Phintias, is known as a member of the Pioneer Group. One hydria, painted by Phintias, shows a courtesan (hetaira) trying to hit a beardless Euthymides with the dregs of a cup of wine, with the caption "this one's for you, beautiful Euthymides!" (ΣΟΙ ΤΕΝΔΙ ΕΥΘΥΜΙΔΕΙ ΚΑΛΟΙ; soi tendi Euthymidēi kalōi). The Pioneer Group are so named for their experimentation within the newly invented red-figure style. In red-figure, the dark slip painted onto the vase was applied to the background, leaving the foreground rendered by the negative space in the natural colour of the clay. This contrasted with the earlier black-figure technique, where the slip was used to paint the figures, and small details picked out by scratching it away. The work of the Pioneer Group was characterised by its interest in human anatomy and the use of dynamic, space-filling poses. Stylistically, Euphronios favoured simple compositions, bold figures, and the innovative use of foreshortening, while his painting technique used washes and variations in line weight to suggest the action of gravity upon clothing.

Euthymides was a rival of his fellow Athenian Euphronios, and one of his signed amphorae (the Revellers Vase) is inscribed with "As never Euphronios" (Ancient Greek: ΗΟΣ ΟΥΔΕΠΟΤΕ ΕΥΦΡΟΝΙΟΣ, romanized: hōs oudepote Euphronios). Both painters were familiar with each other's work, and the inscription is generally interpreted as a taunt or challenge to Euphronios. Gisela Richter specifically interpreted it as a reference to Euthymides's use of three-quarter views, in contrast with the front-on or side-on perspective universal in Euphronios's work. However, it has also been interpreted as claiming that Euphronios had never taken part in a komos (a drunken ritual dance depicted on the vase), perhaps because this was an aristocratic activity and Euphronios was of comparatively low social origin.

Eight vessels signed by Euthymides survive: seven that he painted, and one which he made but did not paint. Of these, he identifies himself as the painter on five, as the potter on two, and as both of these on one. He may also have painted a terracotta plaque, found on the Acropolis, showing a running warrior. Most of his works are on Type A amphorae and kalpides, though he also painted three neck amphorae (including one with innovative twisted handles), a pelike, a volute krater, a cylindrical stand, a plate and two cups.

Eva C. Keuls names Smikros, another painter of the Pioneer Group, as a disciple or apprentice of his. He is also believed to have been the teacher of another Athenian red-figure vase painter, the Kleophrades Painter, and possibly that of the Berlin Painter.

== Works ==
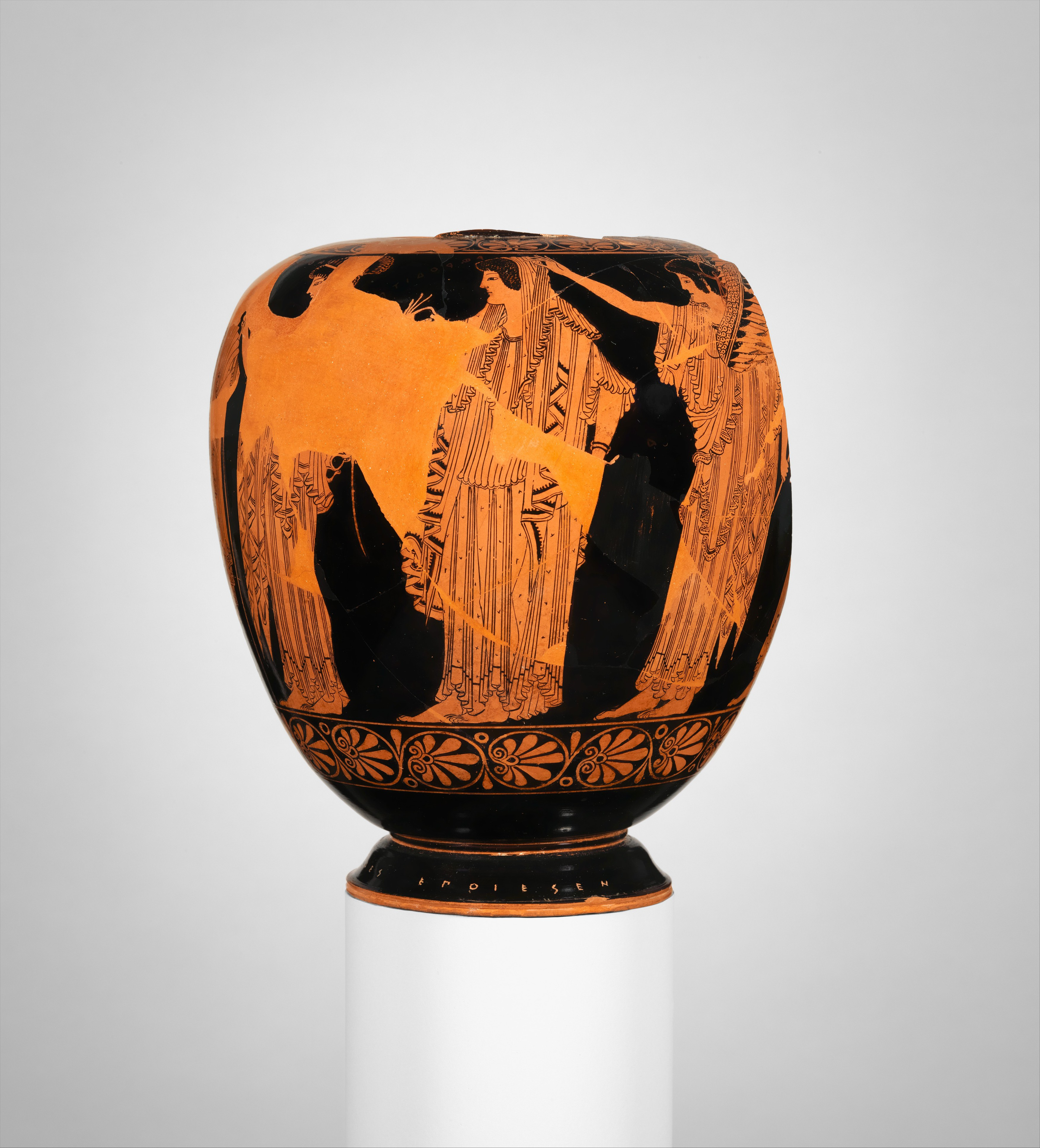
Oinochoe (wine-jug), showing the Judgement of Paris

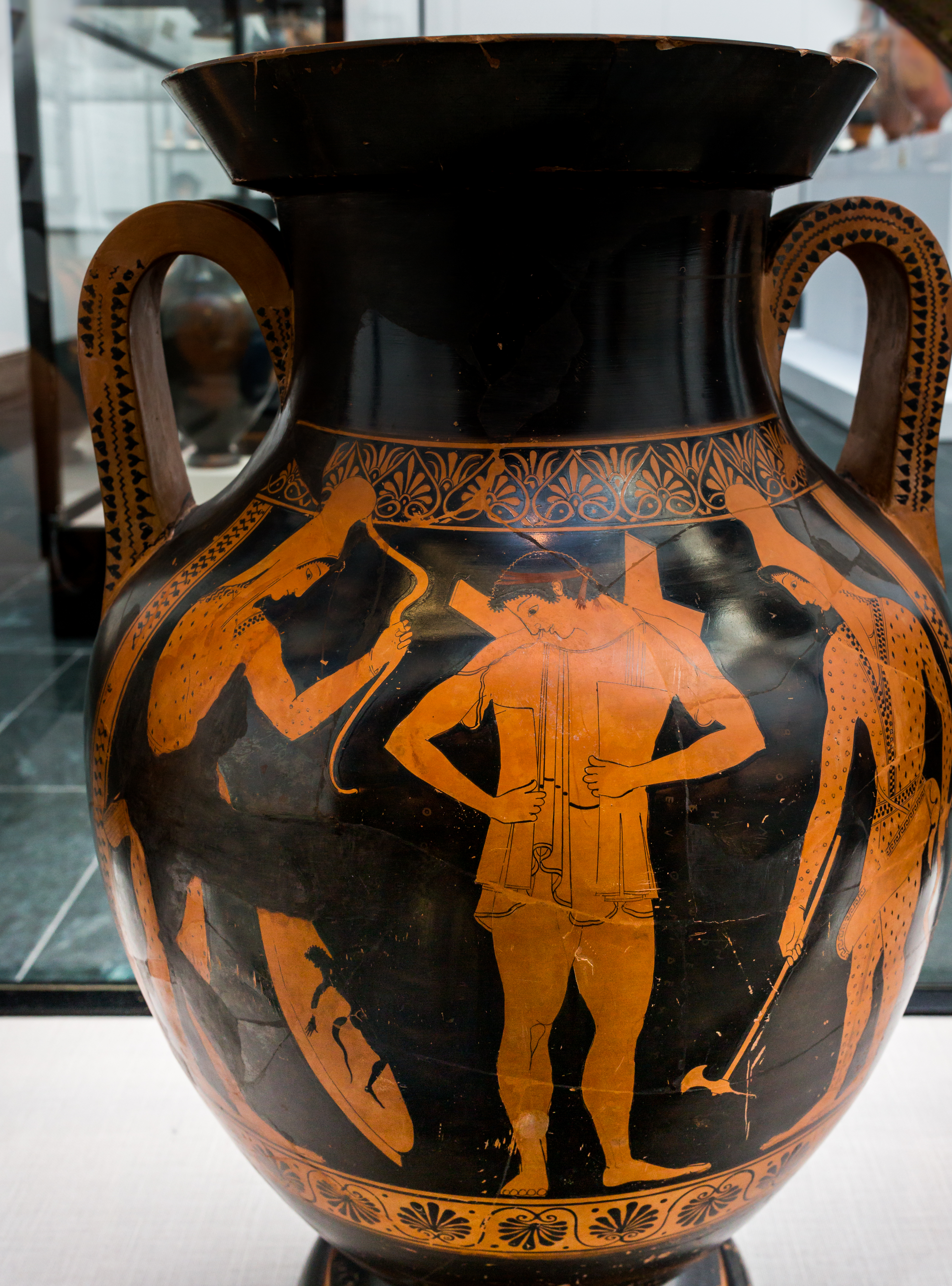
A warrior, named as Thorykion, arms in the presence of two Scythian archers: Euthymides's signature and patronymic can be read near his right leg.

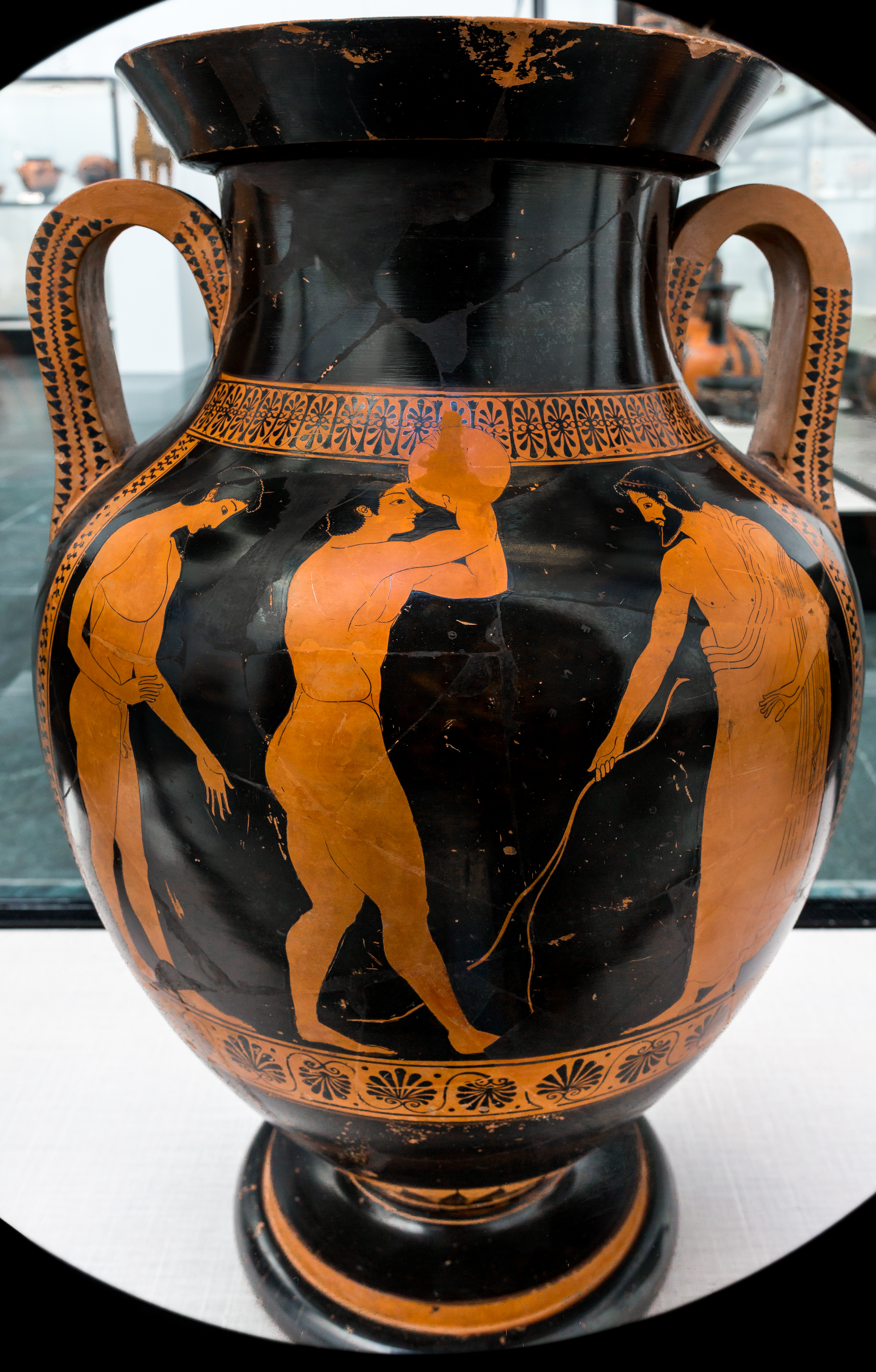
Opposite side of the same vase, showing two athletes and their trainer: Euthymides's signature and patronymic are between the trainer's body and stick.

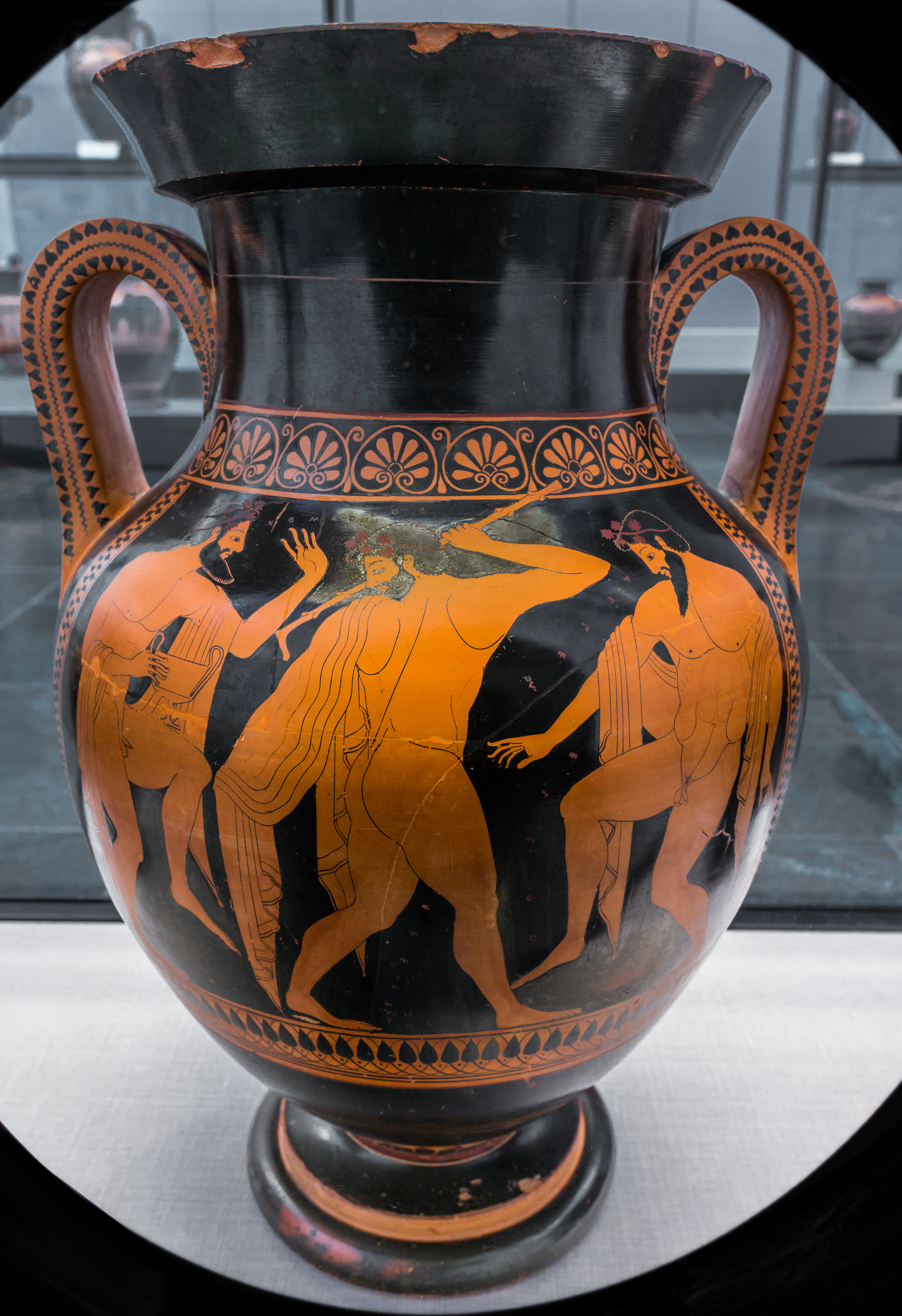
The komos (drunken ritual dance) on the Revellers Vase

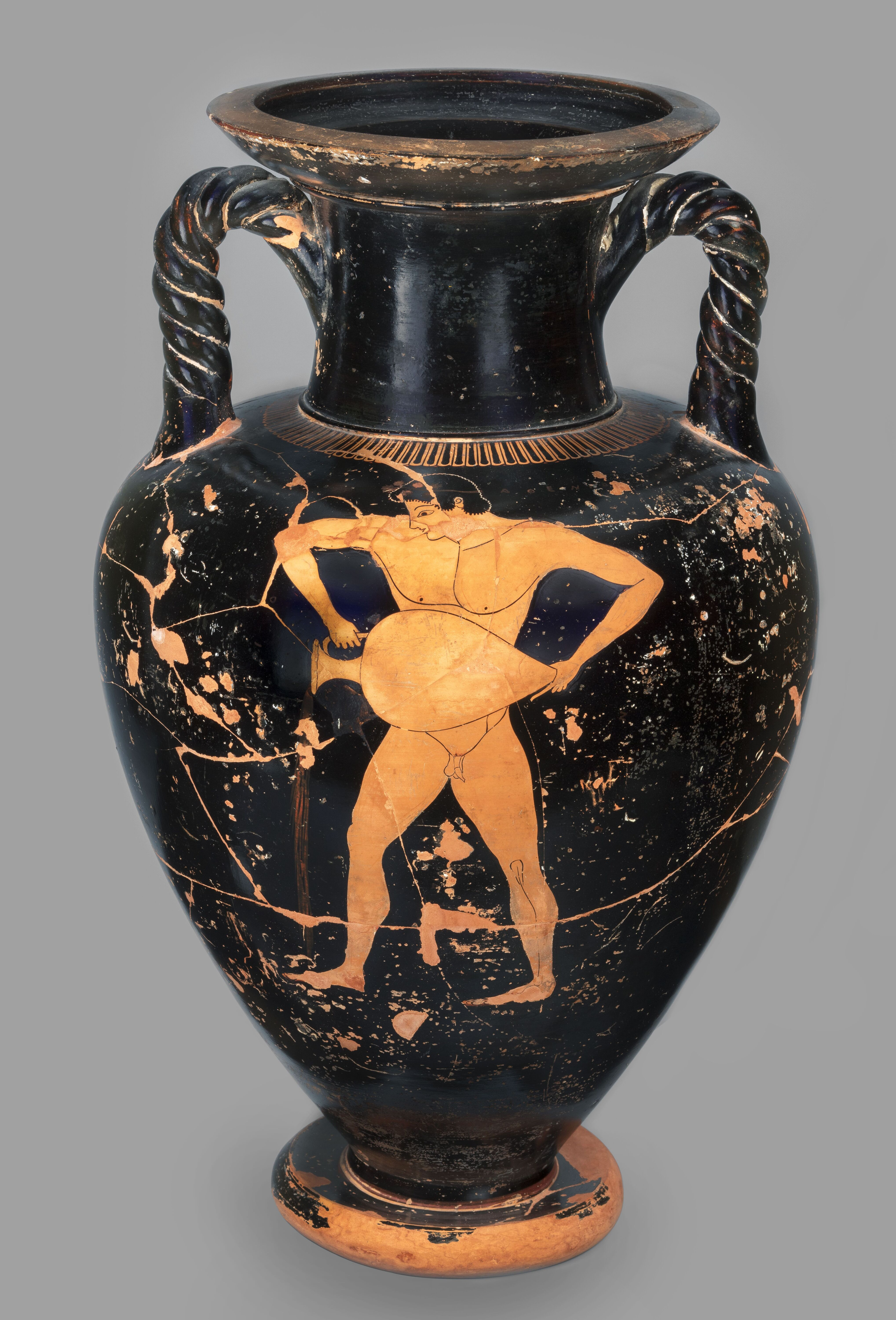
Amphora showing a young man pouring wine from an amphora, with the inscription ΟΙΝΟΝ ΗΕΔΥΝ ΕΝΧΕ ("Pour in the sweet wine!")

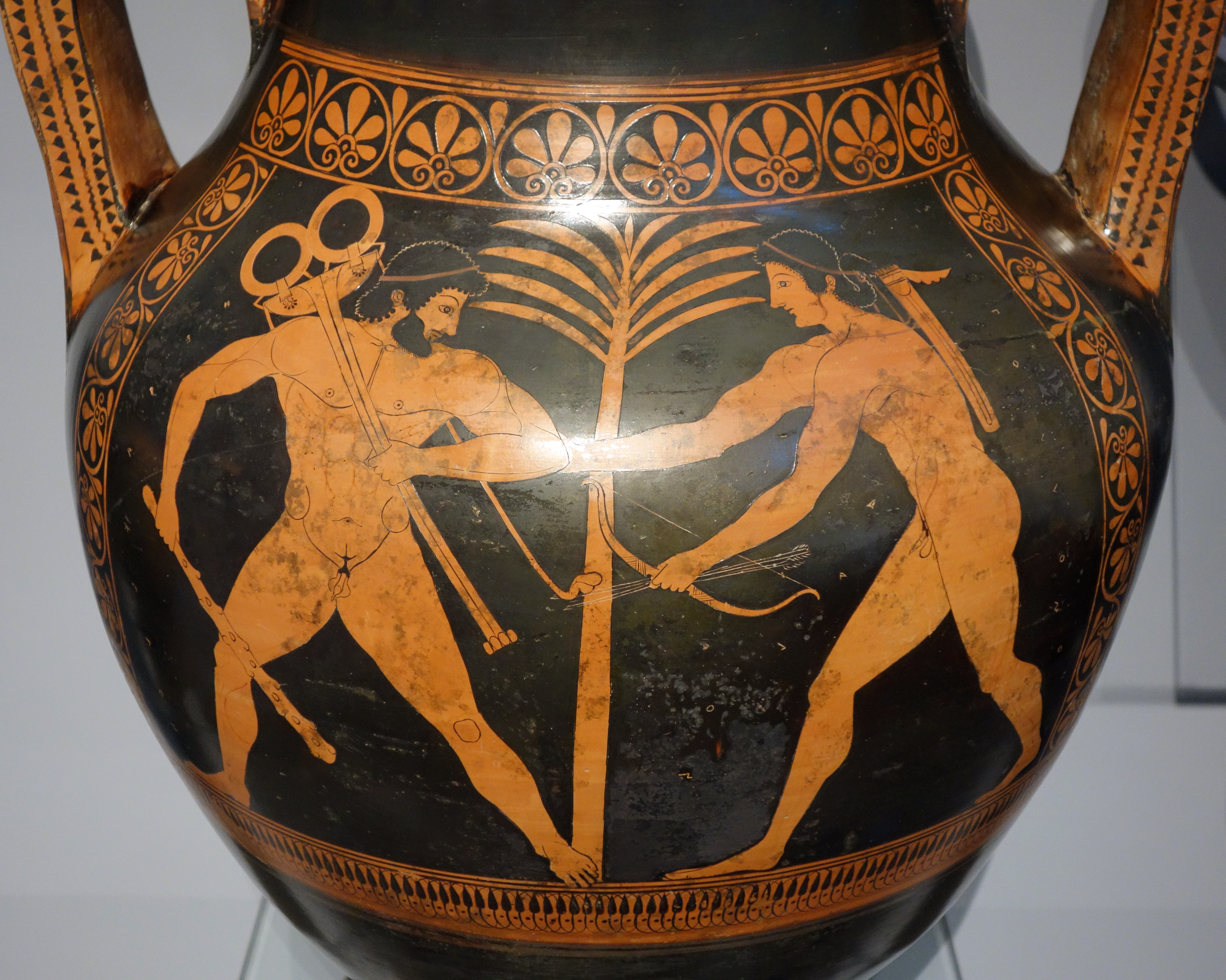
Amphora showing the struggle between Herakles and Apollo for the Delphic tripod, attributed to the circle of Euthymides

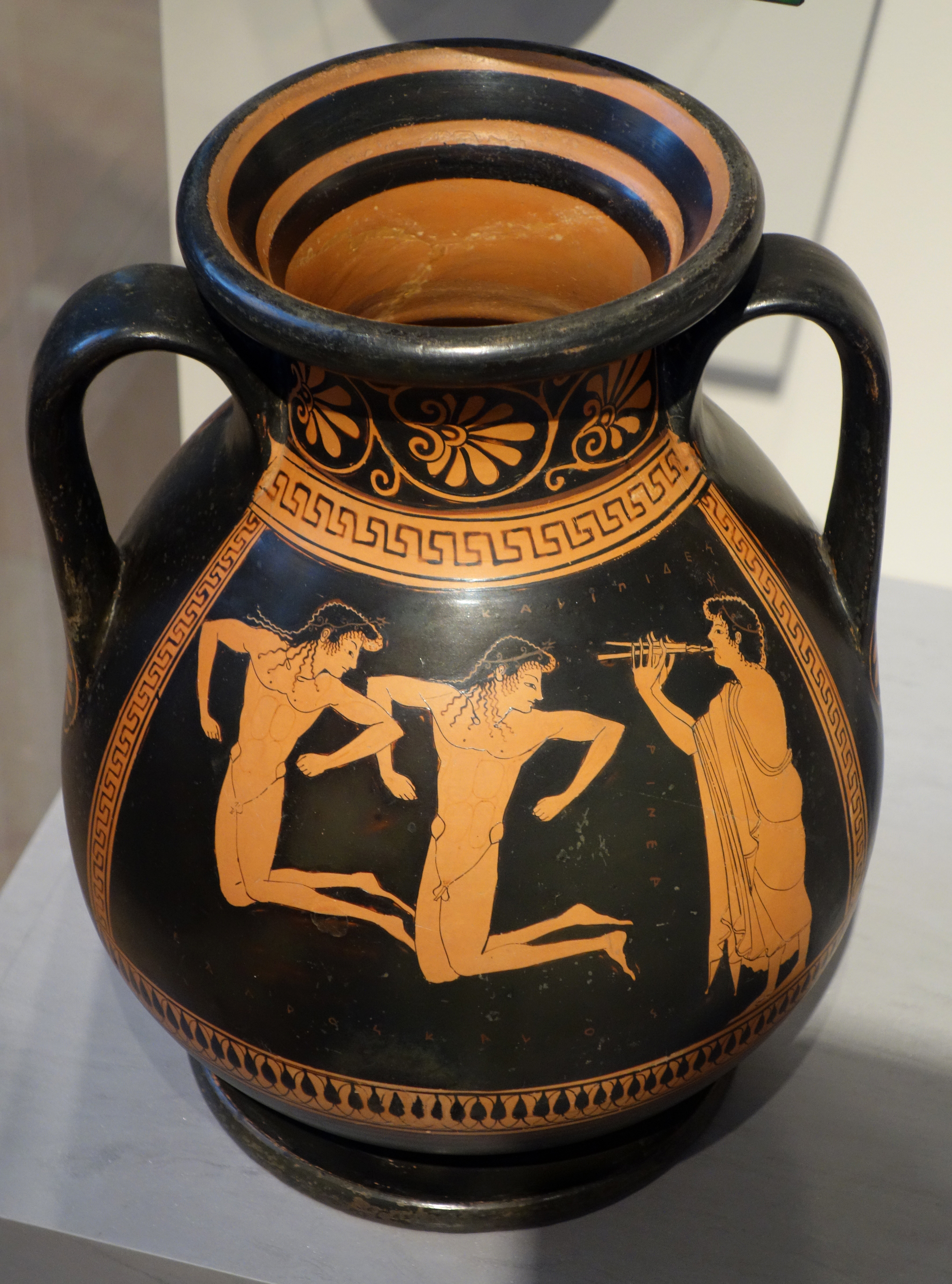
Red-figure pelike, showing jumping dancers, suggested by Martin Robertson to be a work by Euthymides

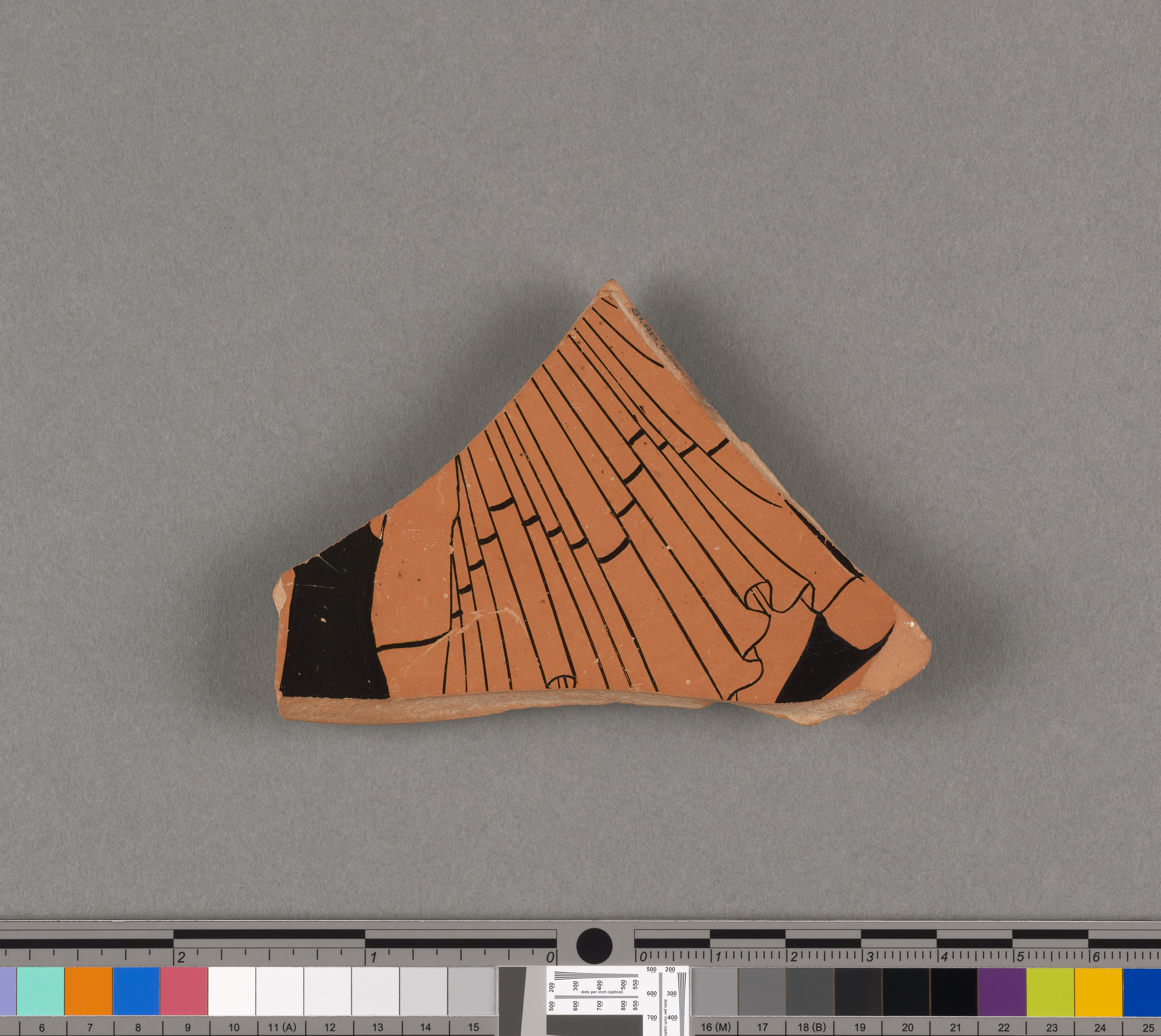
Fragment of a plate, showing the hem of a robe, attributed to "Euthymides or his manner" by the Getty Museum

== Works cited ==
- Beazley, John D. (1928). Greek Vases in Poland. Oxford University Press. OCLC 838660611 – via HathiTrust.
- Campbell, Gordon, ed. (2007). "Euthymides". The Grove Encyclopedia of Classical Art and Architecture. Oxford University Press. pp. 458–459. ISBN 978-0-19-530082-6 – via Internet Archive.
- Chatzidimitriou, Athina (2005). Παραστάσεις εργαστηρίων και εμπορίου στην εικονογραφία των αρχαϊκών και κλασικών χρόνων [Representations of Workshops and Commerce in the Iconography of the Archaic and Classical Periods] (in Greek). Athens: Archaeological Receipts and Expropriations Fund.
- Clark, Andrew J.; Elston, Maya; Hart, Marie Louise (2002). Understanding Greek Vases. Los Angeles: Getty Publications. ISBN 0-89236-599-4.
- Hedreen, Guy (2016). The Image of the Artist in Archaic and Classical Greece: Art, Poetry, and Subjectivity. Cambridge University Press. ISBN 978-1-107-11825-6.
- Hurwit, Jeffrey M. (1985). The Art and Culture of Early Greece. New York: Cornell University Press. ISBN 978-0-8014-9401-7.
- Hurwit, Jeffrey M. (2015). Artists and Signatures in Ancient Greece. Cambridge University Press. ISBN 978-1-107-10571-3.
- Keuls, Eva C. (1997). Painter and Poet in Ancient Greece: Iconography and the Literary Arts. Berlin: De Gruyter. ISBN 978-3-11-095306-0.
- Lynch, Kathleen (2007). "Attic Red-Figured and White-Ground Pottery". In Papadopoulos, John K.; Camp, John McKesson (eds.). The Art of Antiquity: Piet de Jong and the Athenian Agora. Princeton: American School of Classical Studies at Athens. pp. 203–220. ISBN 978-0-87661-960-5.
- McLean, Bradley Hudson (2002). An Introduction to Greek Epigraphy of the Hellenistic and Roman Periods from Alexander the Great Down to the Reign of Constantine (323 BC – AD 337). Ann Arbor: University of Michigan Press. ISBN 0-472-11238-4.
- Moore, Mary B. (1982). "The Berlin Painter and Troy". Greek Vases in the J. Paul Getty Museum. Vol. 6. Malibu, California: J. Paul Getty Museum. pp. 159–186. ISBN 0-89236-058-5.
- Neer, Richard T. (2002). Style and Politics in Athenian Vase-Painting: The Craft of Democracy, ca. 530–460 BCE. Cambridge University Press. ISBN 0-521-79111-1 – via Internet Archive.
- Neils, Jenifer (2017). "Portrait of an Artist: Euthymides, Son of Pollias". In Seaman, Kirsten; Schultz, Peter (eds.). Artists and Artistic Production in Ancient Greece. Cambridge University Press. pp. 23–36. doi:10.1017/9781139696869.004.
- Richter, Gisela (1958). Attic Red-Figured Vases: A Survey (Revised ed.). New Haven: Yale University Press. OCLC 906216 – via Internet Archive.
- Robertson, C. Martin (1977). "Jumpers". The Burlington Magazine. 118 (887): 78, 81–88. JSTOR 878657.
- Robertson, C. Martin (1981). A Shorter History of Greek Art. Cambridge University Press. ISBN 0-521-28084-2.
- Spivey, Nigel (2019). The Sarpedon Krater: The Life and Afterlife of a Greek Vase. University of Chicago Press. ISBN 978-0-226-66659-4.
- Woodford, Susan (1993). The Trojan War in Ancient Art. New York: Cornell University Press. ISBN 0-8014-8164-3.
