= Stamnos =

Style of ancient Greek vase

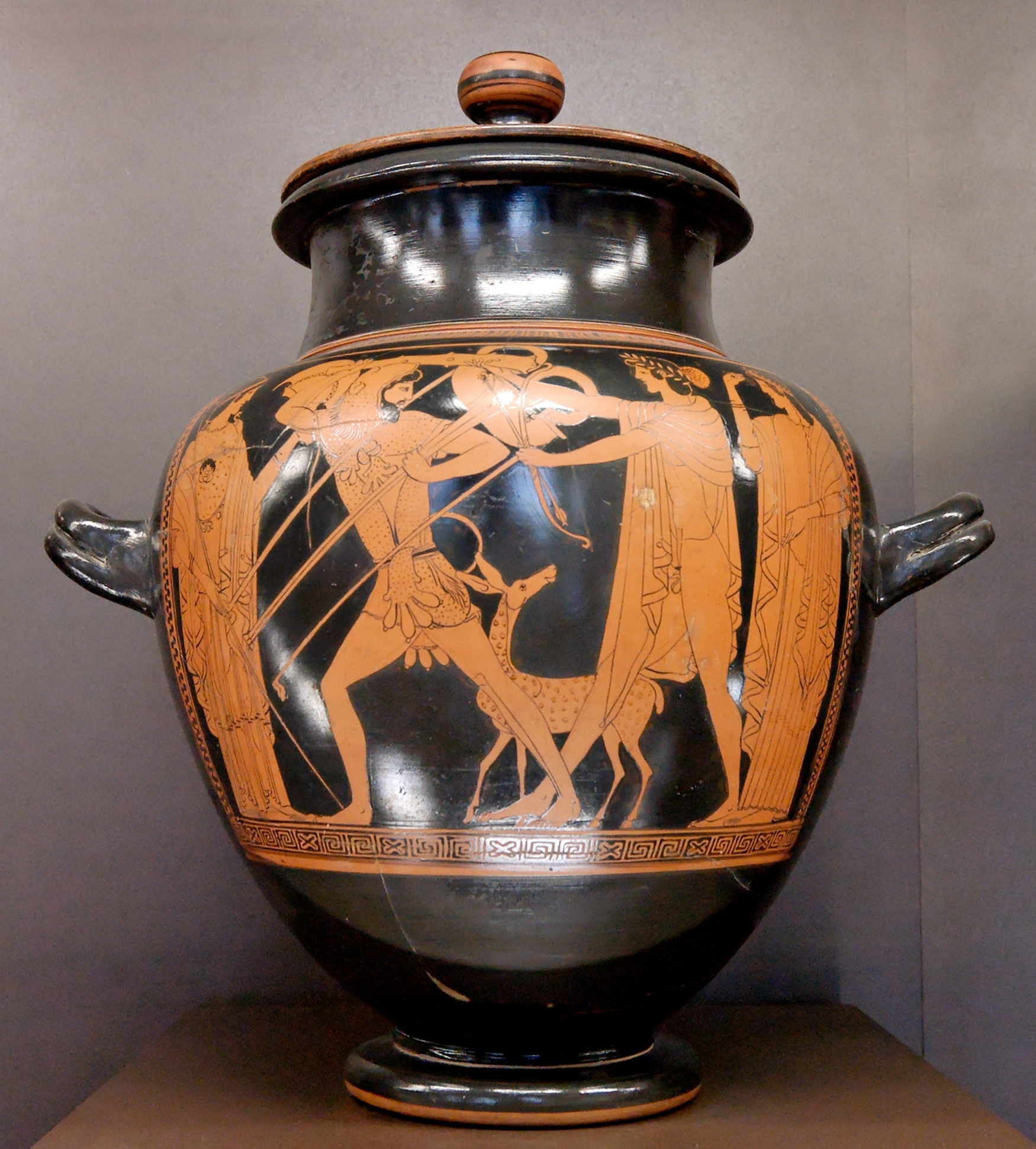
Attic red-figure stamnos, c. 480 BCE; Louvre

A stamnos (Ancient Greek: στάμνος; plural stamnoi) is a type of ancient Greek vase used to serve and store liquids. Stamnoi have a wide mouth, a foot, and two handles, and were usually made with a lid. The earliest known examples come from archaic Laconia and Etruria, and they began to be manufactured in Athens in the middle of the fifth century BCE.

Attic stamnoi, often finely decorated, were mostly made for export to Etruria. They are often found in funerary contexts, and may have been purchased specifically for this use; in vase-paintings, they are often shown being used to mix or serve wine, sometimes with a ladle. They were painted in red-figure, in black-figure and using Six's technique, by artists including Oltos, Euphronios, Smikros, Polygnotos, the Berlin Painter and the Kleophrades Painter. Their manufacture ceased around 420 BCE, possibly due to the reduction in trade between Athens and Italy brought on by the Peloponnesian War and the failure of the Sicilian Expedition in 415–413 BCE. Local examples continued to be made in Italy, and vessels of similar shape were made in Athens into the Hellenistic period (323–30 BCE).

In the nineteenth and early twentieth centuries, stamnoi were sometimes thought to be associated with the god Dionysos, and occasionally named "Lenaean vases" after a claimed connection to the Dionysian Lenaea festival. This connection is now considered doubtful, since the artwork on stamnoi does not seem to favour Dionysiac themes more than that of other vase-types, and the large number of exports among the known examples of stamnoi makes it unlikely that they were used for religious rituals in Attica in any large number.

== Characteristics ==
The Greek word stamnos (and its diminutive stamnion) was first applied in the nineteenth century to a pot with a wide mouth, which usually has a foot at the base and horizontal handles at its widest point. Stamnoi were nearly always matte glazed inside, and probably always made with a lid. (Note: These lids are frequently lost.) The characteristics and measurements of stamnoi are particularly variably by comparison to other Greek vase types. Similarly, the styles of decoration varied considerably, as did the shape and ornamentation of the handles.

In antiquity, the term stamnos is first attested in the work of the fifth-century poet Hermippus, and referred to a clay pot used to store water, wine or oil: it was a generic word equivalent to keramos (κέραμος; 'earthen vessel'). An early fourth-century inscription from Chostia in Boeotia mentions the existence of bronze stamnoi. (Note: Philippaki 1967, p. xix. For the inscription and its date, see Feyel & Platon 1938, pp. 149–150)

== History ==
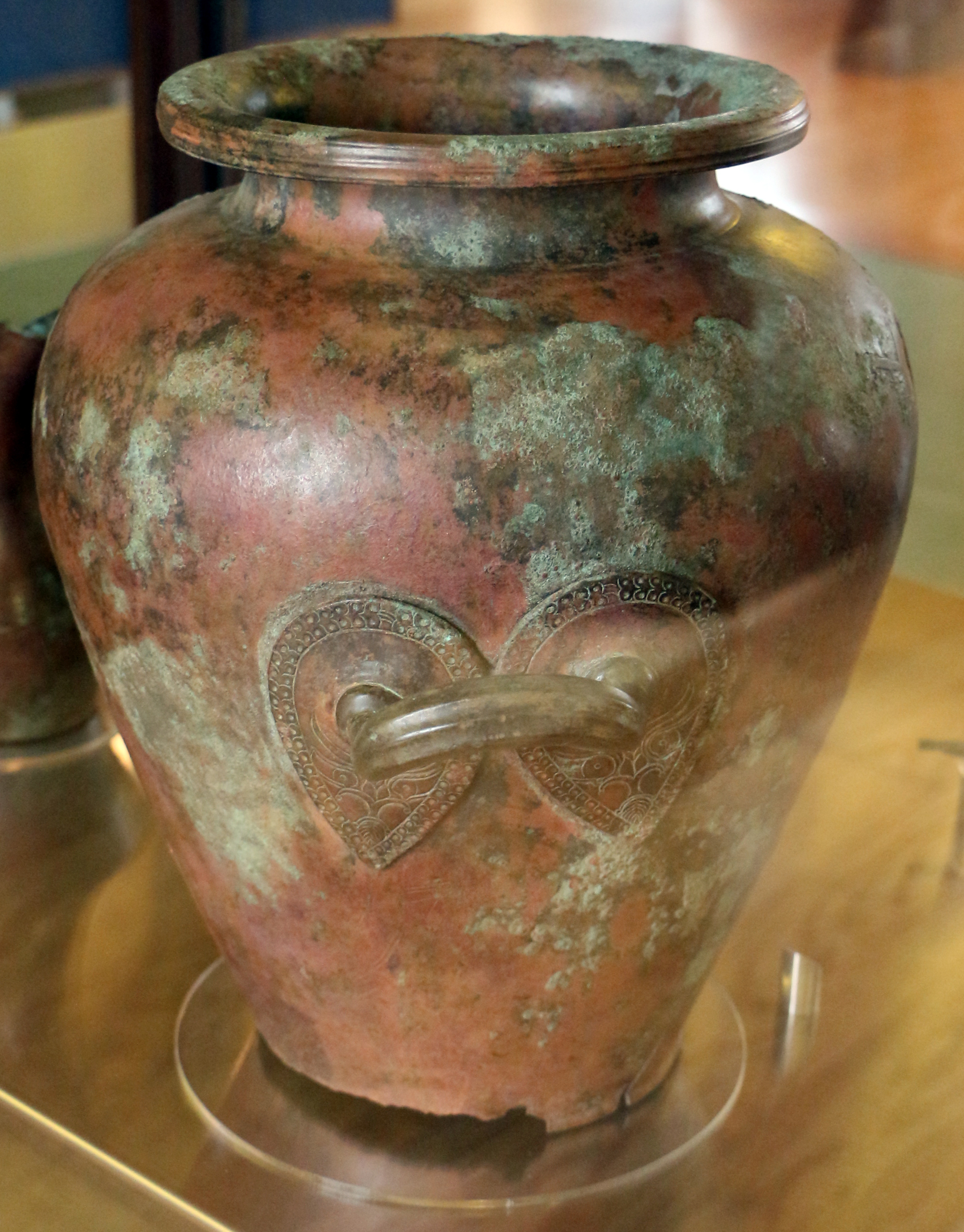
Bronze Etruscan stamnos from Populonia, 5th century BCE

Stamnoi were first made during the Archaic period, in central Italy, particularly Etruria, and in the Greek region of Laconia. (Note: Scheibler 2006. On Laconian stamnoi, see Stibbe 1984.) Although vases with similar characteristics (a wide mouth, two handles and a low foot) are known from Mycenaean pottery and the early Geometric period, true stamnoi first appeared in Attic pottery in the mid-fifth century BCE.

Barbara Philippaki considers the oldest known Attic example to be the Hirsch Stamnos, painted in the black-figure technique shortly before 550 BCE: Evelyn Harrison considers this a "kind of proto-stamnos", and Dietrich von Bothmer calls it a "stamnoid vase". Thereafter, no surviving Attic stamnoi were made until around 530 BCE, when they began to be painted in the newly invented red-figure style. The earliest known red-figure stamnos was made by the potter Pamphaios and painted by Oltos. Other early examples were painted by Euphronios and Smikros, members of the Pioneer Group which innovated in red-figure painting at the end of the sixth century. (Note: Philippaki 1967, p. 4. On the Pioneer Group, see Campbell 2007.)

Around 500 BCE, the shape began again to be used by painters working in the older black-figure style, while at least seven surviving examples were made using Six's technique, whereby red colour was superimposed upon a black-painted background. Notable painters working on stamnoi included Polygnotos, the Berlin Painter and the Kleophrades Painter. Stamnoi were produced in Athens until about 420 BCE, though vessels of similar characteristics continued to be made into the Hellenistic period (323–30 BCE).

Around five hundred Attic stamnoi are known, of which all but a few were found in Italy. Most surviving examples were found in Etruria, suggesting that the vase-shape was primarily made for export to the Etruscans. The end of their manufacture in Athens (c. 420 BCE) may have been a result of the Peloponnesian War between Athens and Sparta: in particular, the failure of Athens's attempt to capture Sicily in 415–413 BCE interrupted trade between Athens and the western-Greek cities of Magna Graecia. During the remainder of the fifth century and into the fourth, locally made stamnoi continued to be produced in Etruria in both pottery and bronze. Other examples from the fourth century were made by the native Italiote and Faliscan peoples of Italy.

== Function ==
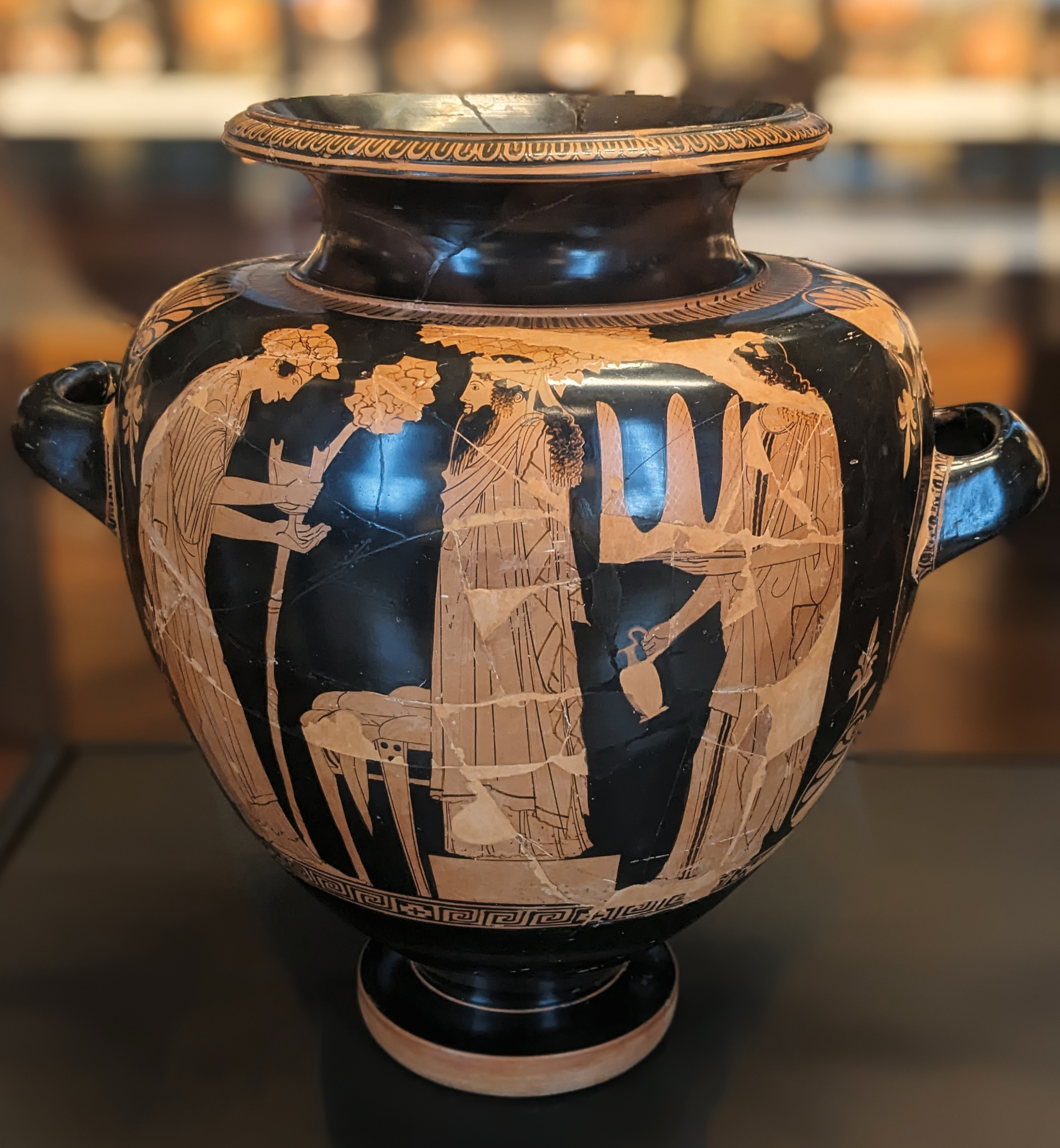
Red-figure stamnos with Dionysos and his followers, 440s BCE

The early stamnoi made in Italy may have been used both to mix wine and as cinerary vessels. Finely decorated examples may have been intended more for display than for everyday use; they were often used as grave goods, and may have been bought specifically for this use. Vases of this shape are depicted as being carried in the palm of the hand, or by the handles: Barbara Philippaki suggests that they were probably, like other similar vases, also carried on the shoulder or head.

When depicted on Greek vases, (Note: Depictions of stamnoi are exclusively found on other stamnoi.) stamnoi are used for the mixing of wine. They may also have been used to store or serve other liquids like water, honey, milk and oil. (Note: Dietrich von Bothmer considers storage to have been their primary purpose, and the explanation for the presence of the lid (to reduce evaporation and spoilage).) In the Greek Anthology, a collection of poems compiled from the 1st century CE, the stamnos was used as a unit of measure for wine: it seems to have been equivalent to half an amphora. They are often depicted with ladles being used to serve the liquid from them, and ladles are sometimes found with them when buried in tombs.

The stamnos is sometimes associated with the worship of the god Dionysos, as images of Dionysiac cult are often found painted upon stamnoi. The suggestion was first made by Vincenzo Campanari in the nineteenth century, and connected to specific feasts of Dionysus by scholars including Paul Foucart, Otto Jahn and August Frickenhaus in the late nineteenth and early twentieth centuries. Barbara Philippaki and Faya Causey-Frel, however, downplay this connection, pointing to the occurrence of other topics without obvious relevance to the god on stamnoi, as well as the presence of clearly Dionysiac themes on other vase types, such as kraters, cups, lekythoi and skyphoi not considered to be specifically associated with the god. Stamnoi are sometimes known as "Lenaean vases" on the basis of a putative connection to the Lenaea, an Athenian festival of Dionysus, though Ingeborg Scheibler considers that association improbable given that stamnoi both originated outside Attica and were generally sent overseas rather than used in the region.

== Gallery ==
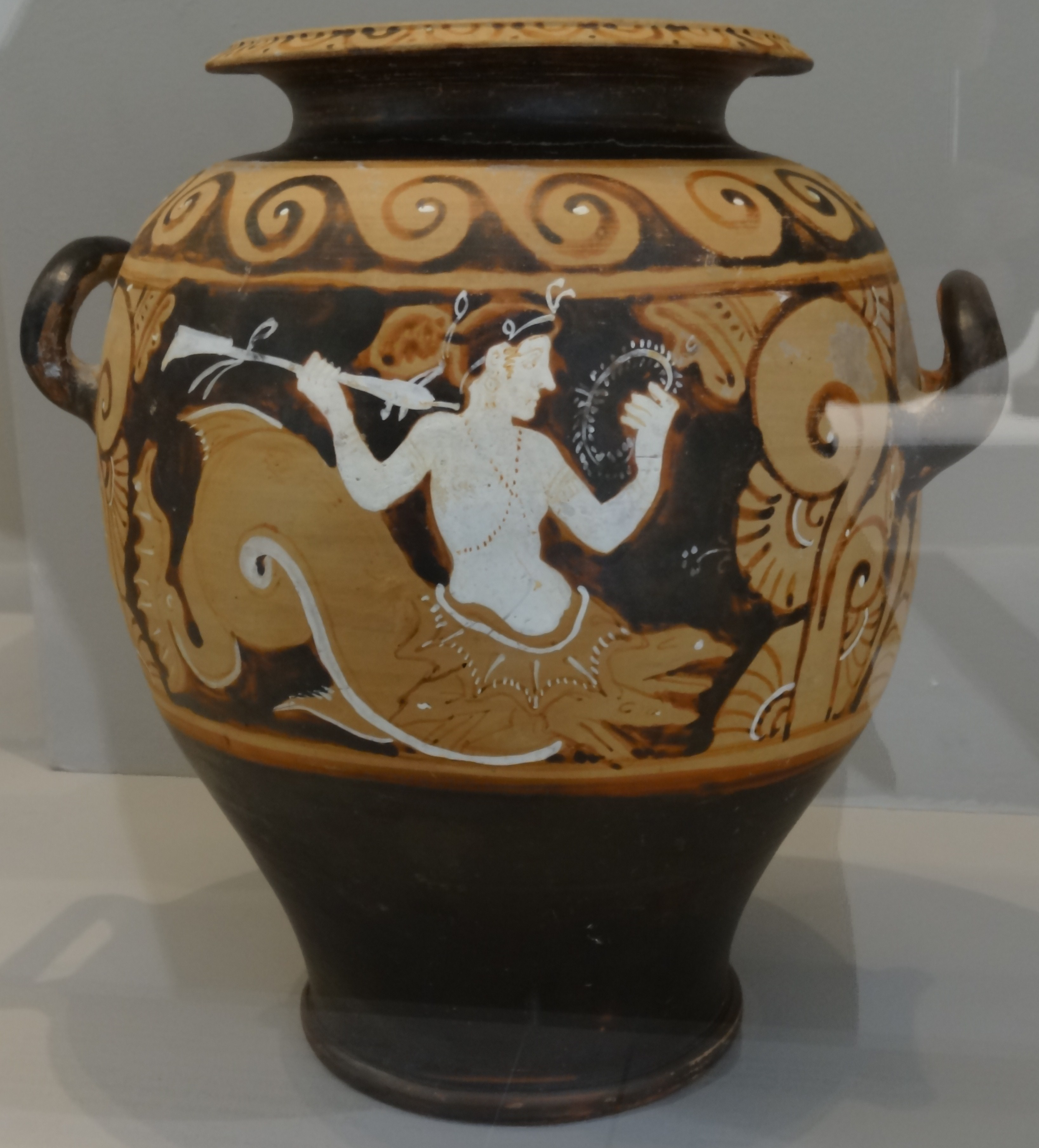
Etruscan stamnos, showing the sea-monster Scylla

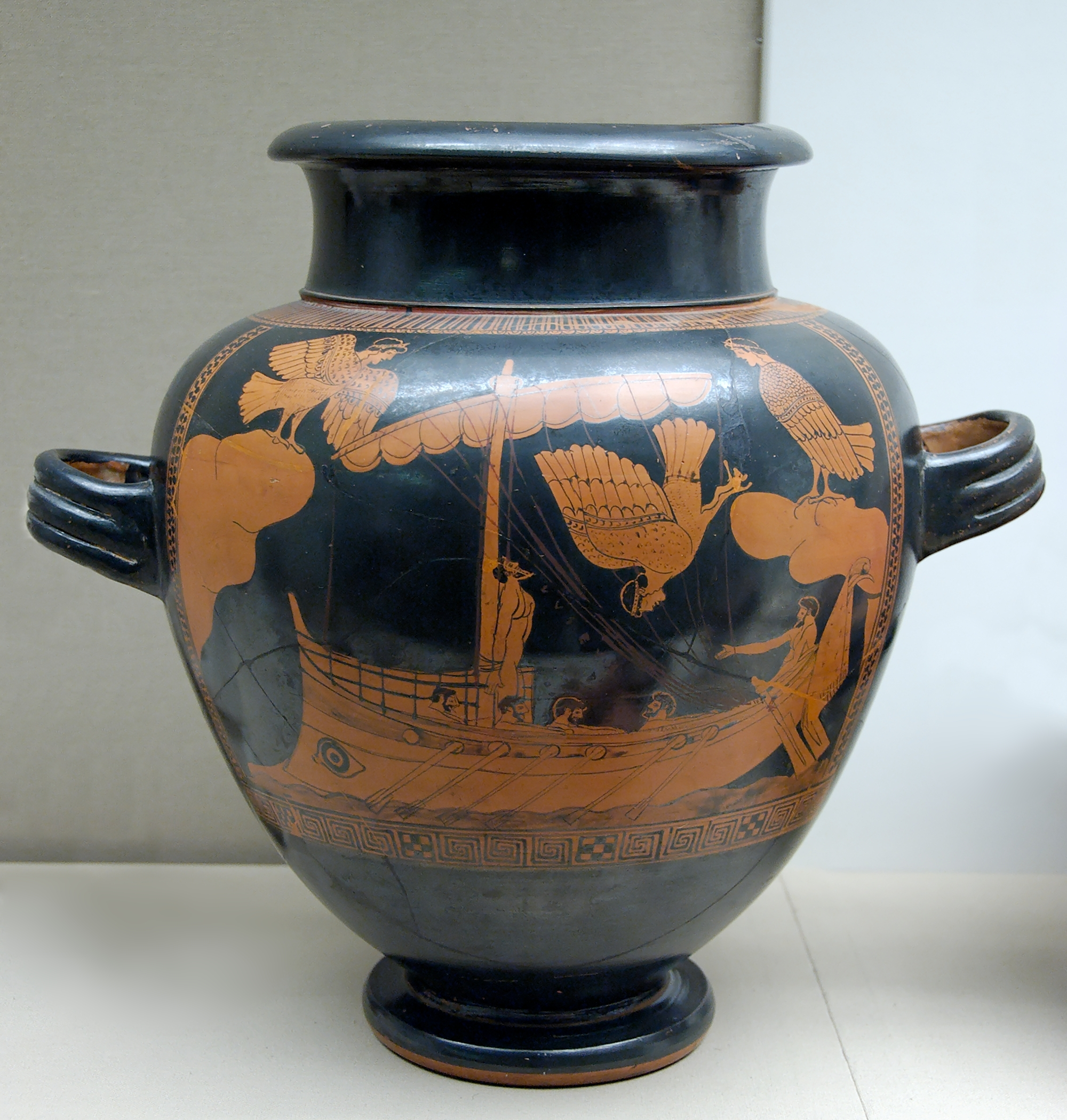
Red-figure stamnos showing Odysseus tied to his mast while passing the Sirens, 440s BCE, British Museum

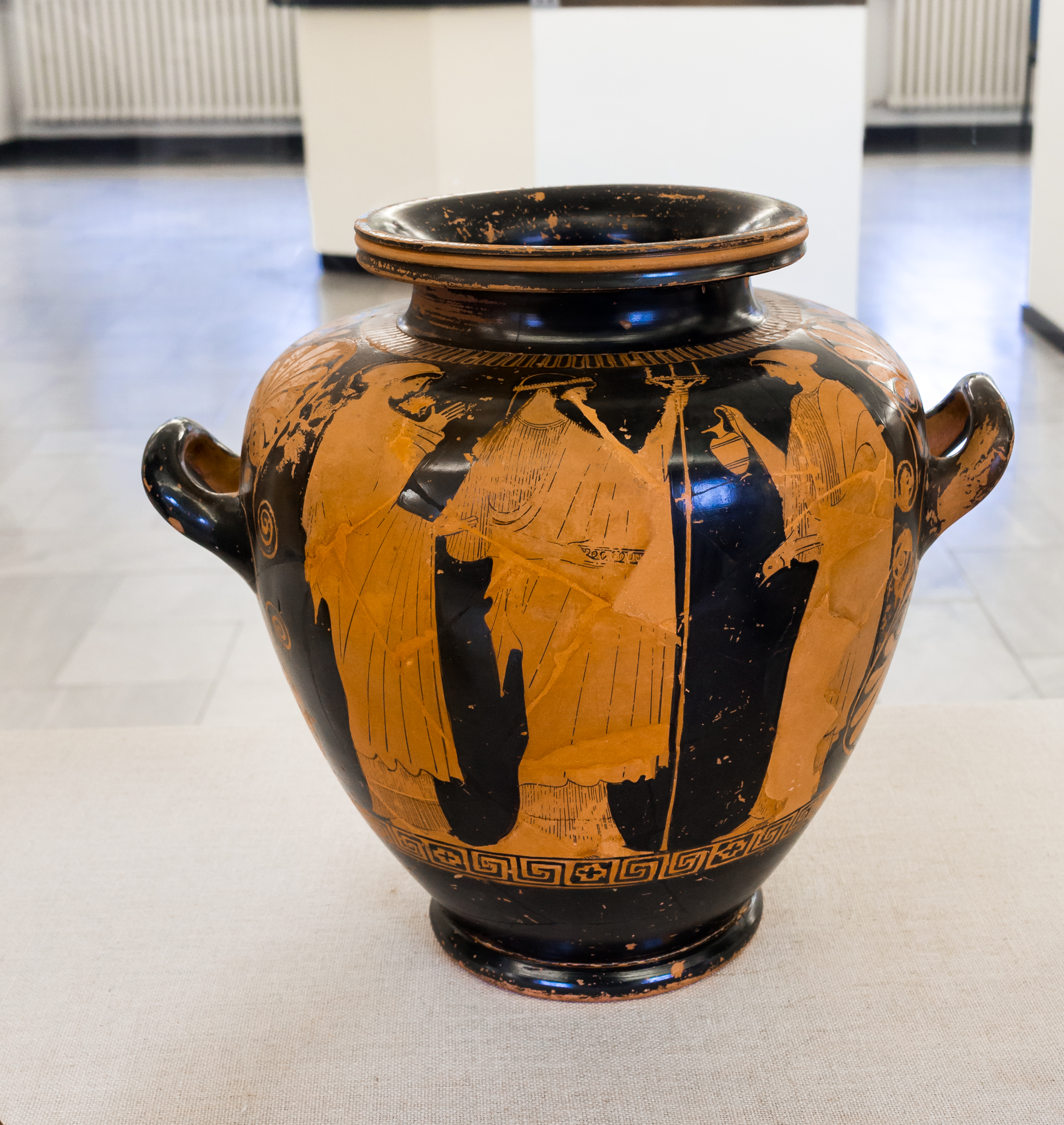
Stamnos showing Poseidon, Amphitrite and a Nereid, c. 475 – c. 450 BCE

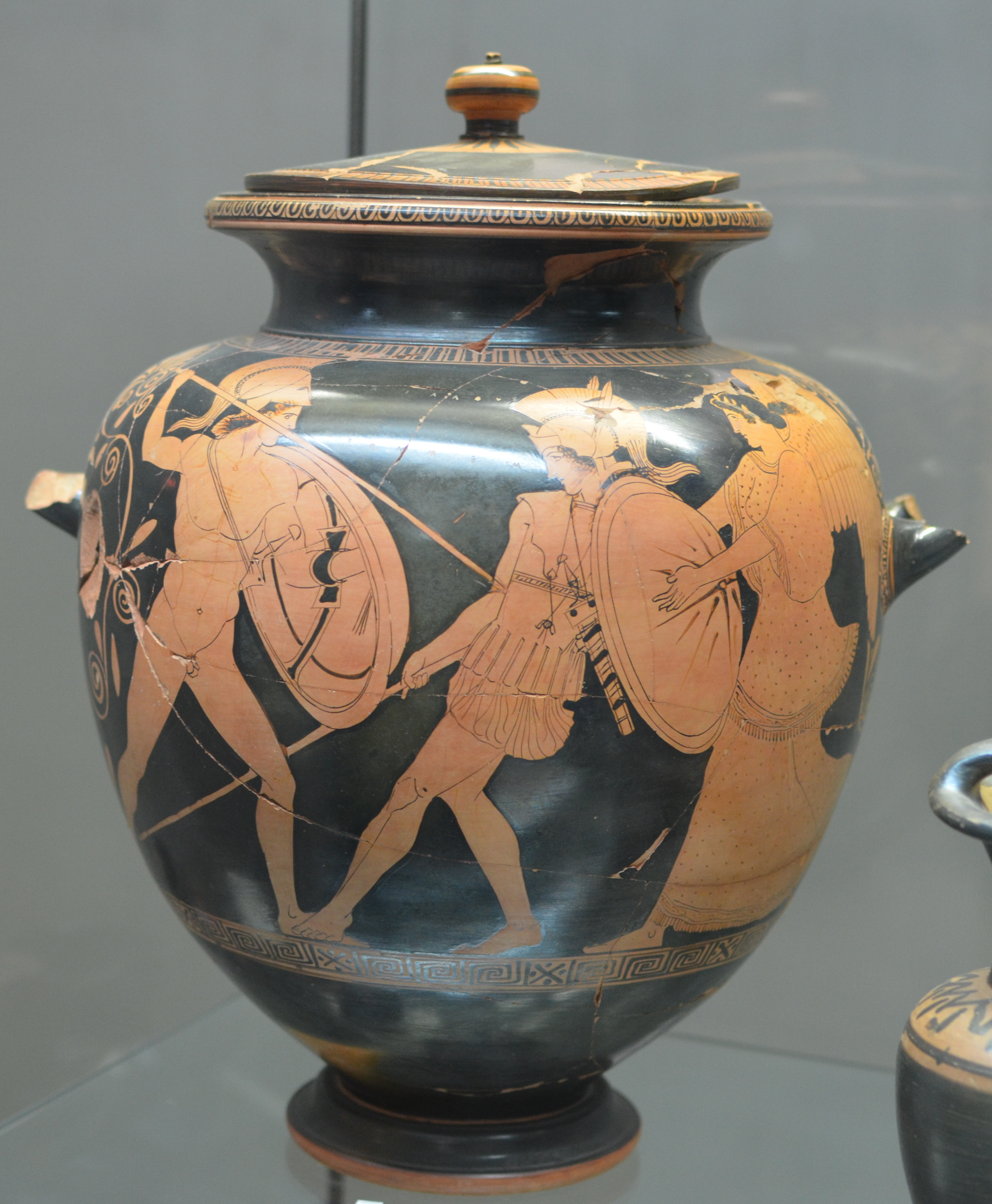
Red-figure stamnos by Polygnotos: Achilles slays Memnon, who falls into the arms of his mother Eos.

== Works cited ==
- von Bothmer, Dietrich (1967). "Review: The Attic Stamnos by Barbara Philippaki". Gnomon. 39 (8): 813–819. JSTOR 27684322.
- Boulter, Cedric G. (1968). "Review: The Attic Stamnos by Barbara Philippaki". American Journal of Archaeology. 72 (2): 185–186. JSTOR 502854.
- Campbell, Gordon, ed. (2007). "Euthymides". The Grove Encyclopaedia of Classical Art and Architecture. Oxford University Press. pp. 458–459. ISBN 978-0-19-530082-6.
- Causey-Frel, Faya (1980). "Introduction". Stamnoi: An Exhibition at the J. Paul Getty Museum. Malibu, California: J. Paul Getty Museum. ISBN 0-89236-029-1.
- Feyel, Michel; Platon, Nikolaos (1938). "Inventaire sacré de Thespies trouvé à Chostia (Béotie)" [Sacred Inventory from Thespiae Found at Chostia (Boeotia)]. Bulletin de correspondance hellénique (in French). 62: 149–166.
- Harrison, Evelyn B. (1968). "Review: The Attic Stamnos by Barbara Philippaki". The Classical World. 61 (9): 401. JSTOR 4346552.
- Philippaki, Barbara (1967). The Attic Stamnos. Oxford Monographs on Classical Archaeology. London: Oxford University Press. OCLC 526374.
- Scheibler, Ingeborg (2006). "Stamnos". Brill's New Pauly. doi:10.1163/1574-9347_bnp_e1120940.
- Stibbe, Conrad M. (1984). "Lo stamnos laconico" [The Laconian Stamnos]. Bollettino d'Arte (in Italian). 27: 4–5, 8–9.
