= Phintias (painter) =

Late 6th century BCE Athenian vase-painter

- Φιντίας
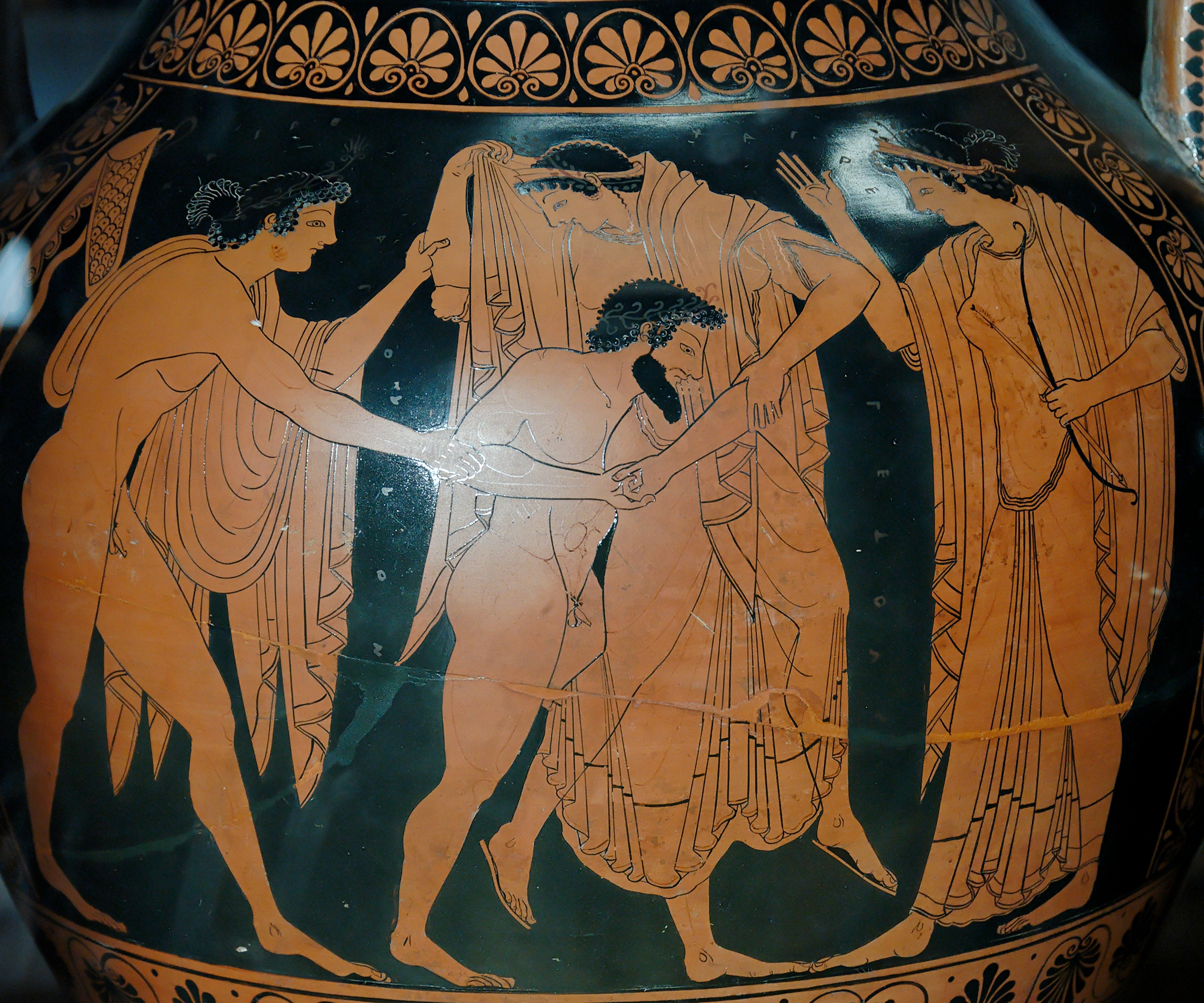
- The rape of Leto by Tityos, from an amphora by Phintias, c. 515 BCE
- Citizenship: Athenian
- Occupations: Painter; Potter
- Years active: c. 525 – c. 500 BCE
- Movement: Pioneer Group

Phintias (Ancient Greek: Φιντίας; fl. c. 520 – c. 500 BCE) was an ancient Greek vase painter. He worked in the red-figure style, and was an early member of the Pioneer Group of artists who made innovative contributions to the medium through their interest in human anatomy, dynamic poses, and the use of foreshortening.

Phintias may have been a pupil of Psiax, an early red-figure artist, and his early works show similarities with those of Psiax and other pre-Pioneer painters. He is considered among the foremost of the Pioneer artists, though Gordon Campbell judges him inferior to his contemporaries Euphronios and Euthymides, and Brian A. Sparkes categorises his work as comparatively old-fashioned. Fewer than twenty signed works of his survive, across a variety of pottery styles. As well as a painter, he was a potter: he crafted the uniquely shaped lekythos known as the name-vase of the Painter of the Frankfurt Acorn.

== Life and works ==
Phintias was active in Athens between approximately 520 and 500 BCE. He was a member of the Pioneer Group, a group of vase-painters so named for their experimentation within the newly invented red-figure style. In red-figure, the dark slip painted onto the vase was applied to the background, leaving the foreground rendered by the negative space in the natural color of the clay. This contrasted with the earlier black-figure technique, where the slip was used to paint the figures, and small details picked out by scratching it away. Although the Pioneers did not invent red-figure painting, they were active within a decade or so of its beginnings, and seem to have regarded themselves as a coherent social group. Their style was characterised by its interest in human anatomy and the use of dynamic, space-filling poses, and they more frequently signed their work than previous artists.

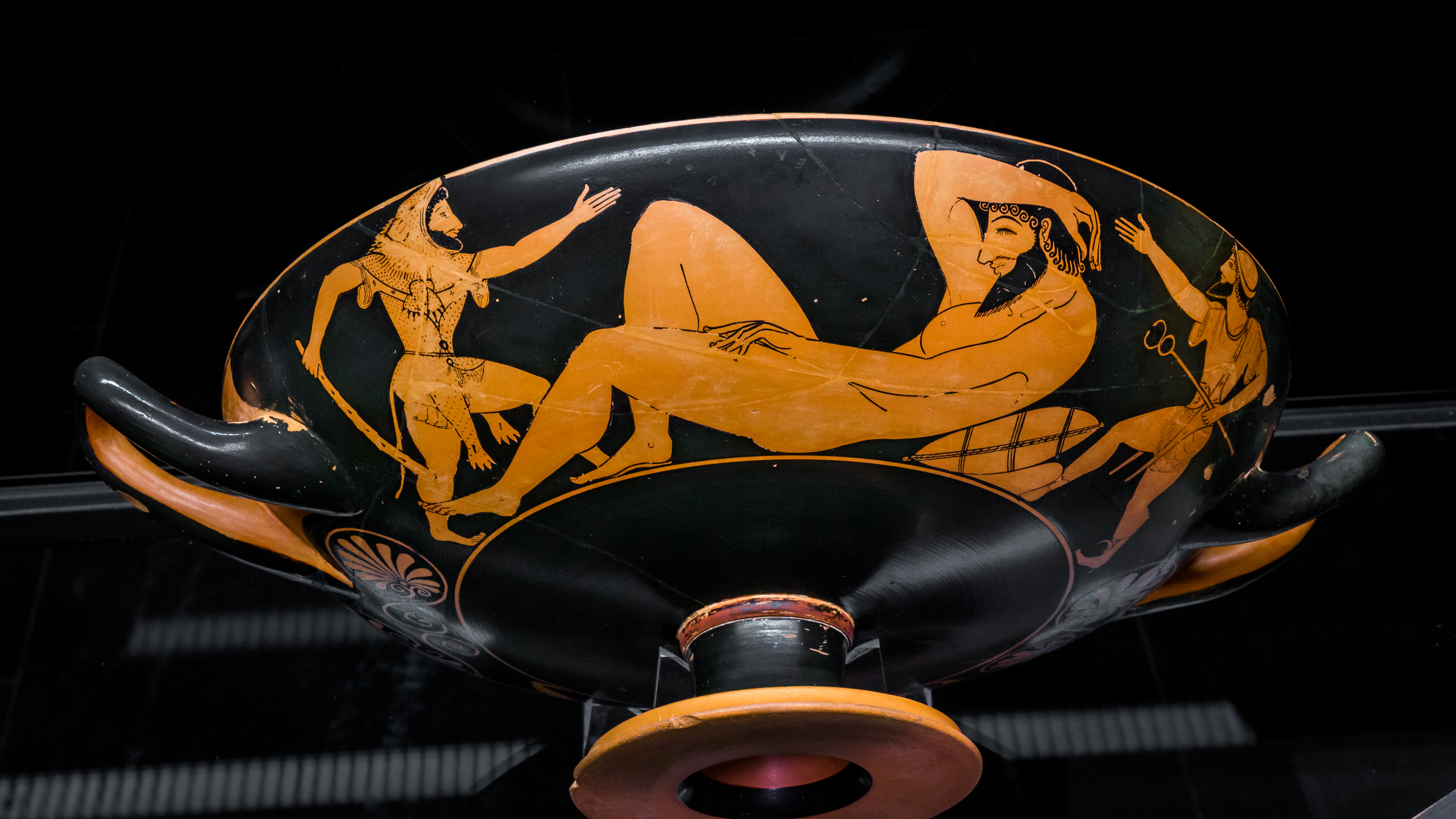
Cup (kylix) painted by Phintias: John Beazley and Martin Robertson consider this "proto-Pioneer" in style, and the earliest known work attributable to him.

Like the other major members of the Pioneer group, Phintias frequently wrote on his vases, and depicted some of his "colleagues". One hydria painted by Phintias shows a courtesan (hetaira) trying to hit a beardless Euthymides with the dregs of a cup of wine, with the caption "this one's for you, beautiful Euthymides!" (σοὶ τένδι Εὐθυμίδῃ καλῷ; soi tendi Euthymidēi kalōi). Phintias was active before either Euphronios or Euthymides, and Jenifer Neils considers that he was likely older than Euthymides: she also reads the "beautiful Euthymides" inscription as a possible sexual invitation. Gordon Campbell suggests that the variety of spellings used by Phintias when signing his name may indicate that he was not highly literate.

Phintias's early works show stylistic similarities with pre-Pioneer red-figure artists, such as Psiax, Epiktetos and Oltos: Martin Robertson and Robert Slade Folsom suggest that he may have learned to paint from Psiax. Fewer than twenty works attributed to him survive; he displayed a preference for Type A amphorae, which he shared with Euthymides, but also painted a pelike, a volute krater, calyx kraters, both kalpis and shoulder-type hydriai, a psykter. and wine-cups. He was the potter of a triple cockleshell aryballos, now in the Museum of Fine Arts, Boston, and made a uniquely shaped variant of a lekythos, painted as his name-vase by the Painter of the Frankfurt Acorn.

== Assessment ==
Robertson names Phintias, alongside Euphronios and Euthymides, as the best of the Pioneers, though Gordon Campbell considers him less skilled than the other two. Campbell categorises his drawing as "bold and simple", without excessive adornment of clothing or armour, usually relatively few figures, and good attention to detail. He also shared the other Pioneers' interest in the use of foreshortening. Brian A. Sparkes calls him "rather old-fashioned, with a penchant for depicting scenes of everyday life", pointing to the frequent appearances of athletes and sympotic scenes in his painting.

Karl Schefold called his depictions of Dionysus's thiasos (the ecstatic retinue that accompanied the god) on an amphora found at Tarquinia "a masterpiece of archaic spatial disposition".

== Gallery ==
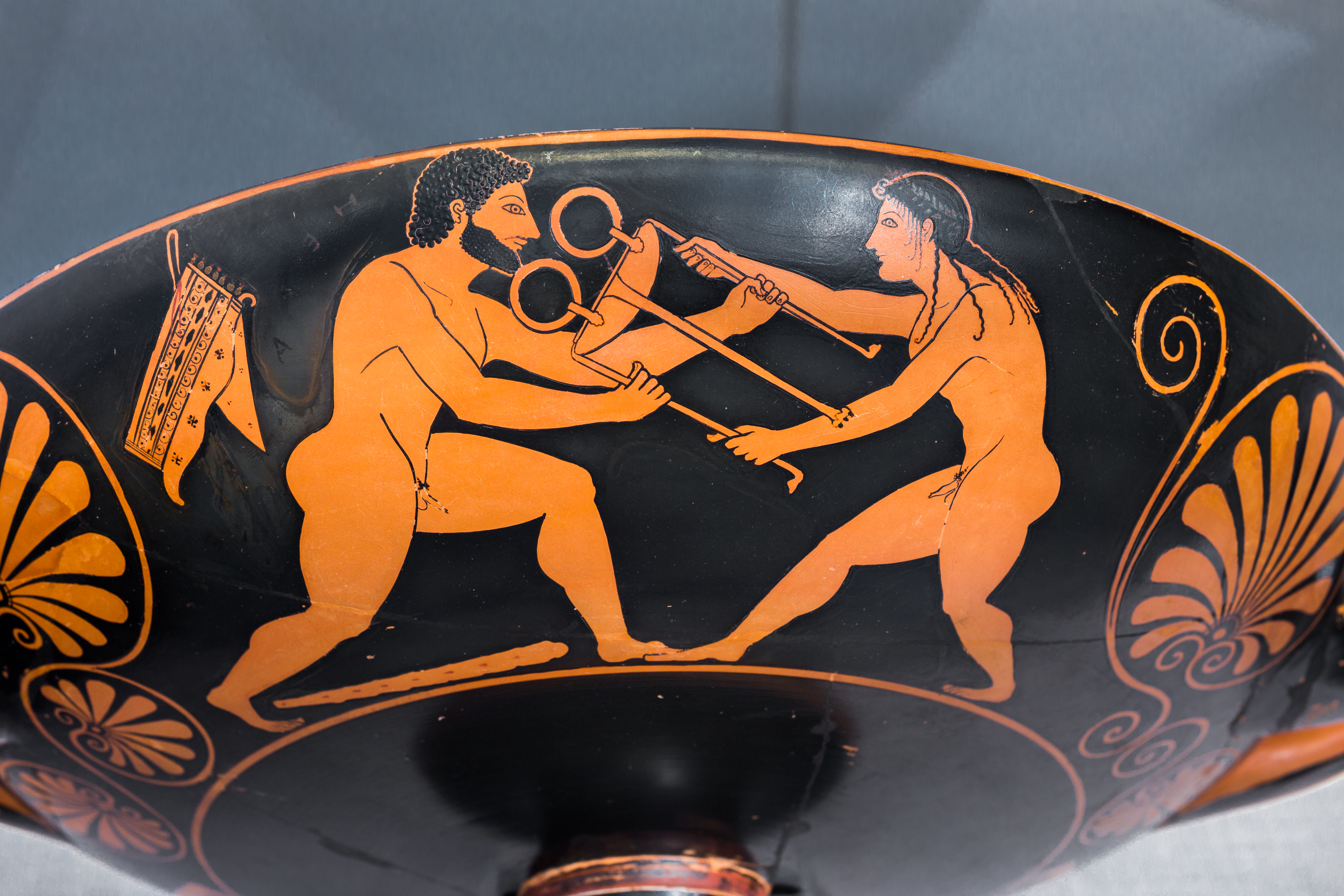
Kylix (wine-cup) showing the contest of Heracles and Apollo for the Delphic tripod. Campbell considers this among Phintias's greatest paintings.

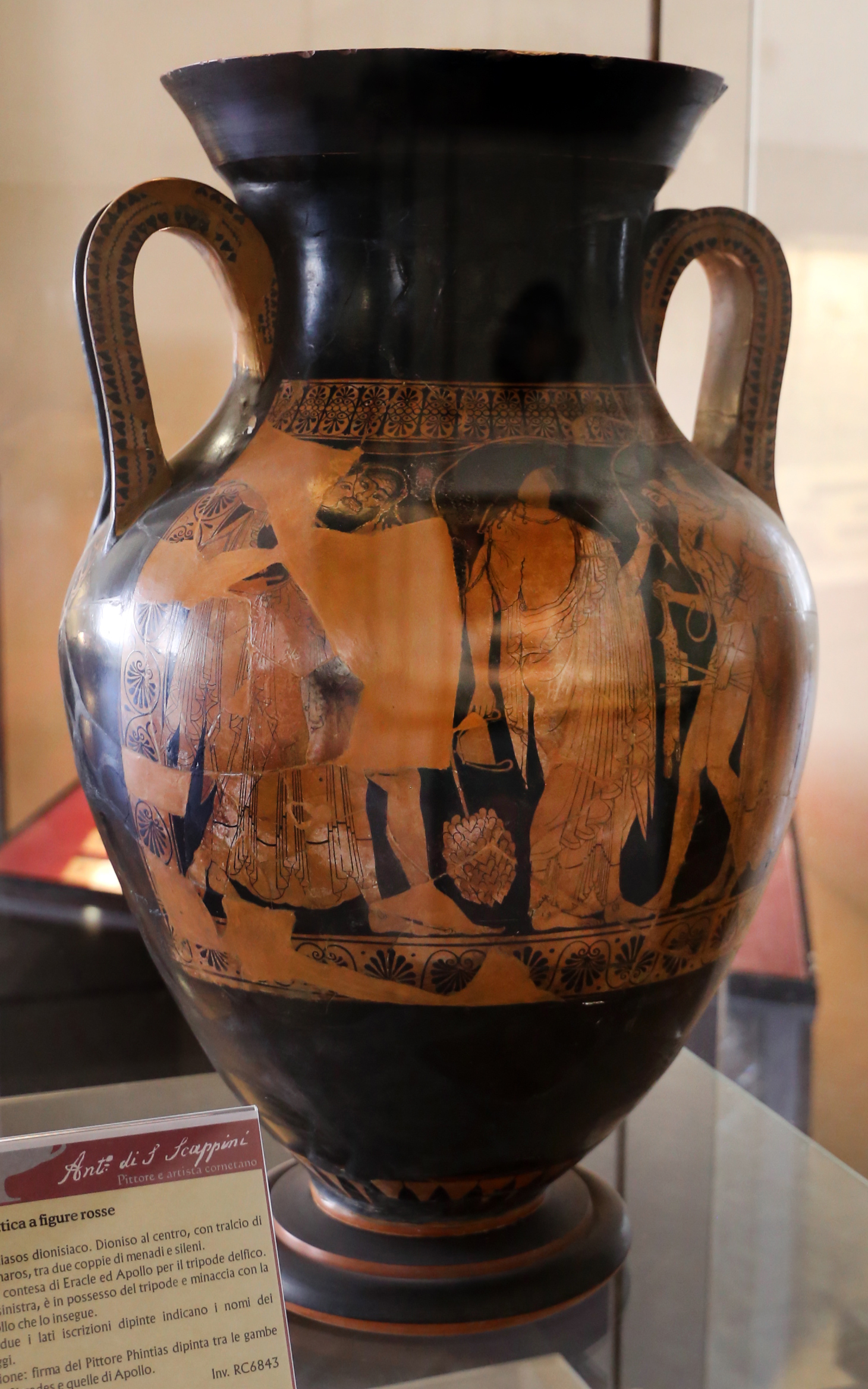
Amphora showing a Dionysiac thiasos, praised by Schefold as "a masterpiece of archaic spatial disposition"

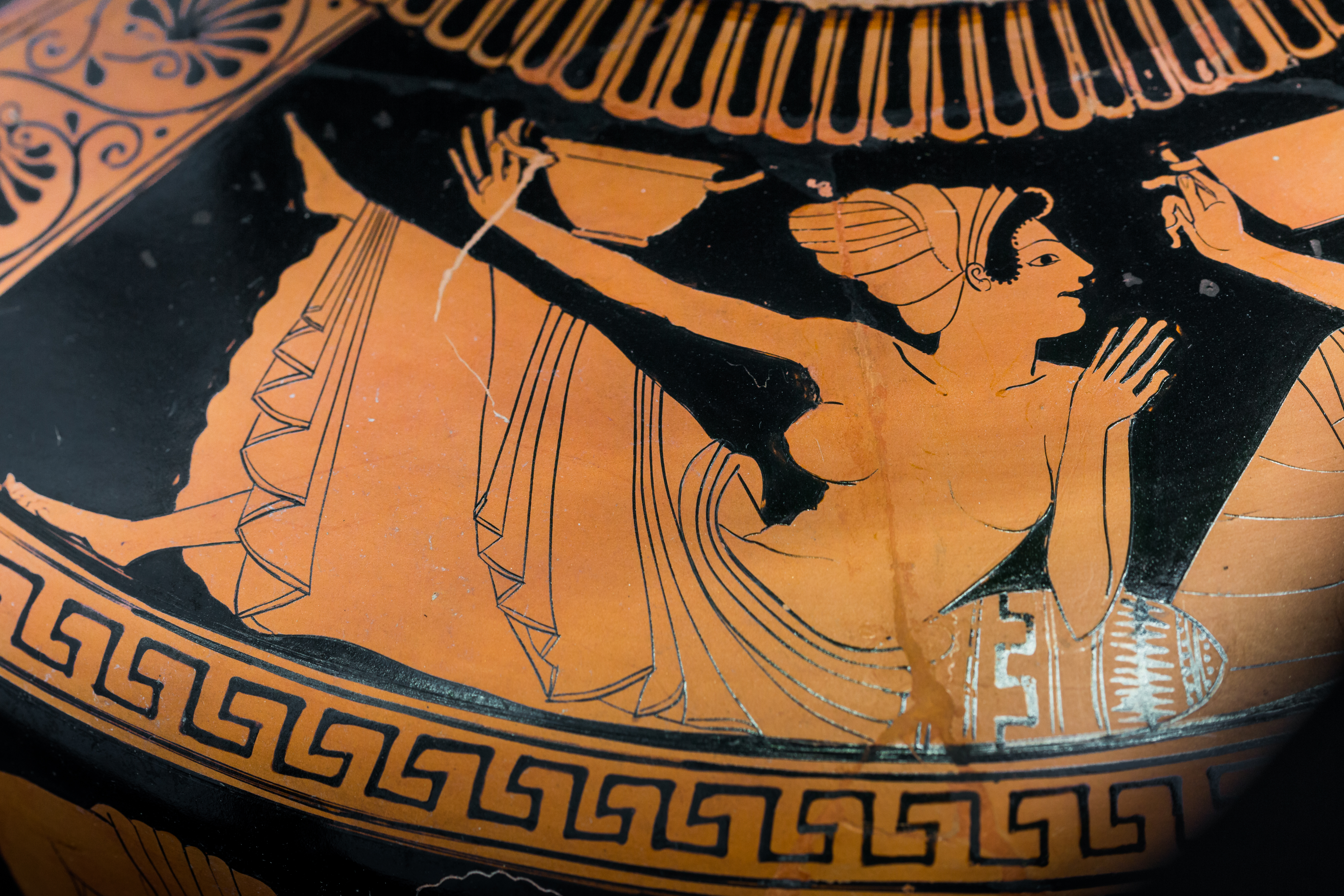
A hetaira (courtesan) reclines at a symposium: she calls "this one's for you, beautiful Euthymides!" (σοὶ τένδι Εὐθυμίδῃ καλῷ; soi tendi Euthymidēi kalōi)

== Sources ==
- Campbell, Gordon (2007). "Phintias". The Grove Encyclopaedia of Classical Art and Architecture. Oxford Reference.
- Chatzidimitriou, Athina (2005). Παραστάσεις εργαστηρίων και εμπορίου στην εικονογραφία των αρχαϊκών και κλασικών χρόνων [Representations of Workshops and Commerce in the Iconography of the Archaic and Classical Periods] (in Greek). Athens: Archaeological Receipts and Expropriations Fund.
- Cohen, Beth (2006). The Colors of Clay: Special Techniques in Athenian Vase-Painting. Los Angeles: Getty Publications. ISBN 978-0-89236-942-3.
- Folsom, Robert Slade (1975). Attic Black-figured Pottery. Park Ridge: Noyes Press. OCLC 1363988.
- Greenhalgh, Paul (2020). Ceramic, Art and Civilisation. London: Bloomsbury Visual Arts. ISBN 978-1-4742-3970-7.
- Hurwit, Jeffrey M. (2015). Artists and Signatures in Ancient Greece. Cambridge University Press. ISBN 978-1-107-10571-3.
- Lezzi-Hafter, Adrienne (2012). "The Xenophantos Chous from Kerch with Cypriot Themes". In Schierup, Stine; Rasmussen, Bodil Bundsgaard (eds.). Red-figure Pottery in Its Ancient Setting. Aarhus University Press. pp. 33–42. ISBN 978-87-7124-332-1.
- Neils, Jenifer (2017). "Portrait of an Artist: Euthymides, Son of Pollias". In Seaman, Kirsten; Schultz, Peter (eds.). Artists and Artistic Production in Ancient Greece. Cambridge University Press. pp. 23–36. doi:10.1017/9781139696869.004.
- Robertson, Martin (1992). The Art of Vase-Painting in Classical Athens. Cambridge University Press. OCLC 1391176949 – via Internet Archive.
- Schefold, Karl (1992). Gods and heroes in Late Archaic Greek Art. Translated by Griffiths, Alan. With the assistance of Luca Giuliani. Cambridge University Press. ISBN 0-521-32718-0.
- Sparkes, Brian A. (1996). The Red and the Black: Studies in Greek Pottery. Abingdon: Routledge. ISBN 0-415-12660-6.
- Wehgartner, Irma (2000), "Phintias [2]", Der Neue Pauly (in German), vol. 9
- Woodford, Susan (1993). The Trojan War in Ancient Art. New York: Cornell University Press. ISBN 0-8014-8164-3.
