= Smikros =

Late 6th century BC Athenian red-figure style vase painter

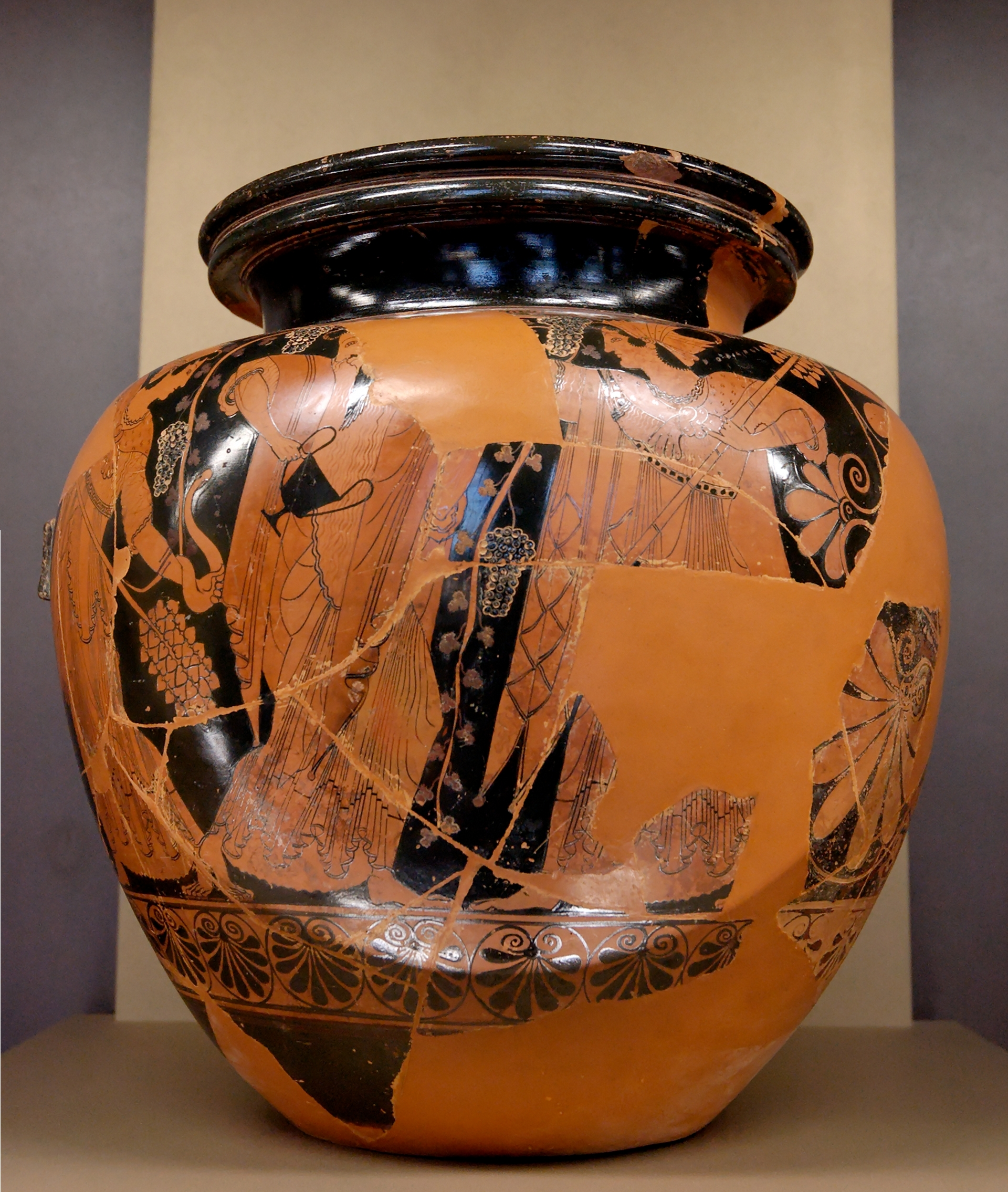
Maenads and Dionysos holding a kantharos, stamnos by Smikros, Louvre Museum.

Smikros (a name meaning "small") was an ancient Greek vase painter who flourished in Athens between 510 and 500 BCE. He was active in the workshop of Euphronios. Along with Euphronios, Euthymides, Hypsis and the Dikaios painter, Smikros was one of the most important representatives of the so-called Pioneer Group of Athenian red figure vase painting.

There are three signed vases from Smikros. John Beazley called him an imitator of Euphronios. It is possible that Smikros cooperated in some late and not completely successful vases, which are assigned to Euphronios. On one psykter in the Hermitage (St Petersburg), Euphronios has a female figure with the inscription Smikra provided, which could be understood to be a reference to his pupil. Another amphora seems to belong to Smikros, which suggests possibly a co-operation between both artists. Smikros might also have decorated another stamnos and two pelikai assigned to him.

Beazley called Smikros a bad draughtsman. This is, however, only in comparison with the other members of the Pioneer Group. At that time, red figure vase painting was still in its infancy and the pioneers were still vigorously experimenting. A lack of ingenuity with the picture composition can be seen. His designs are precise, yet become inaccurate in his representation of such details as ears, fingers and dress.

Guy Hedreen (2016) supposed that Smikros is not a real vase-painter but a fictitious creation by Euphronios.
