= Pioneer Group =

5th-century BCE red-figure vase painters

The Pioneer Group is a term used by scholars for a number of vase painters working in the potters' quarter of Kerameikos in ancient Athens around the beginning of the 5th century BC, around the time of the emergence of red-figure vase painting, which soon displaced the previously dominant black-figure style.

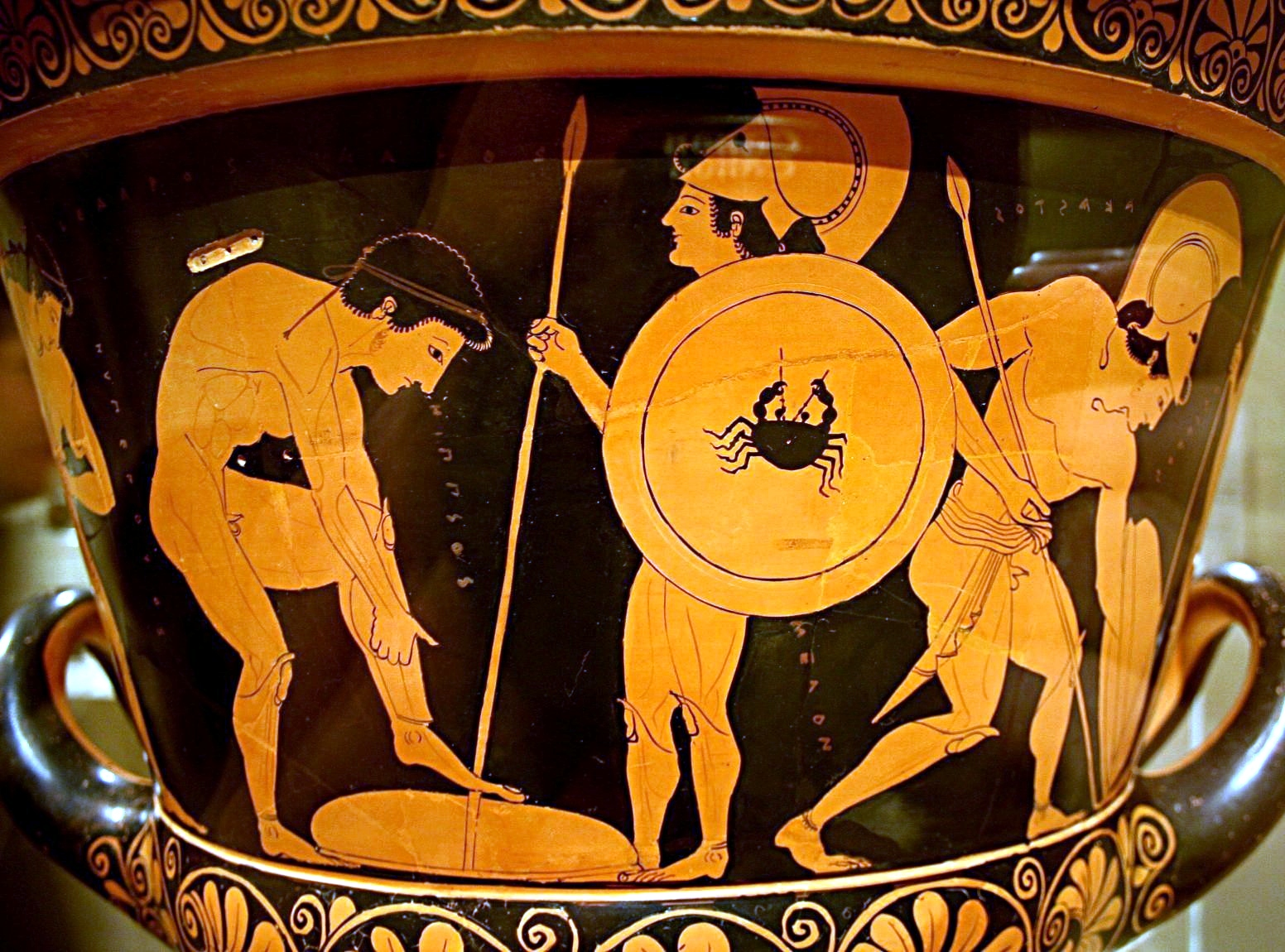
Krater by Euphronios

Described by the British art historian John Boardman as perhaps the first conscious art movement in the western tradition, historians had included a number of artists in the group, including Epiktetos, Euphronios, Euthymides, Oltos, Phintias, Smikros, Hypsis, and the Dikaios Painter.

Archaeologist John Beazley was the first to identify these artists as a coherent group in his works published in the 1940s, in which he developed a taxonomy of ancient Greek pottery by style. No documentary evidence remains of the artists, and everything we know about them was deduced from their surviving work.

The Pioneer Group were not innovators of the red-figure technique but rather late adopters of the practice developed by bilingual vase painters such as Andokides and Psiax, who produced pottery featuring both the black-figure and red-figure techniques.

Coming some ten years after the earliest work in red-figure style, Euphronios' first works are thought to have been produced circa 520 BC. As a group, their work makes frequent reference to one another, often in a playful competitive spirit; Euthymides boasts on one of his signed pots (the Revellers Vase) hos oudepote Euphronios ("as never Euphronios"). Their work is distinctive for its simple rendering of dress, bold handling of anatomy, experimental use of foreshortening and a thematic preference for representations of symposia.
