= Jenifer Neils =

American classical archaeologist (born 1950)

- Born: October 16, 1950 (age 75); Minneapolis, Minnesota, United States
- Education: Northrop Collegiate School, Minneapolis
- Alma mater: Princeton University
- Occupation: Classical Archaeologist

Jenifer Neils (born October 16, 1950) is an American classical archaeologist. She was the first woman Director of the American School of Classical Studies at Athens (2017-2022). Formerly she was the Elsie B. Smith Professor in the Liberal Arts in the Department of Classics at Case Western Reserve University.

== Biography ==
Neils attended Northrop Collegiate School in Minneapolis and earned her AB magna cum laude with Honors in Classical and Near Eastern Archaeology at Bryn Mawr College in 1972. After graduating she was part of the team excavating the Etruscan site of Poggio Civitate (Murlo) under the auspices of Bryn Mawr. She earned a master's degree first class in archaeology at the University of Sydney and spent several summers working with the Australians at the site of Torone in northern Greece. Neils was awarded an MFA (1977) and PhD (1980) from Princeton University where she studied art history and classical archaeology. Since 1989 she has been working at the site of Morgantina in central Sicily, and since 2006 also at Poggio Colla in Tuscany.

After teaching one year (1979–80) in the department of art history at the University of North Carolina, Chapel Hill, Neils was jointly appointed to the curatorial staff of the Cleveland Museum of Art and the art history faculty of Case Western Reserve University. From 1986 to 1998 she held the Ruth Coulter Heede Chair in Art History at Case Western Reserve. Since 2014 she has been a chaired professor in the Classics department. In 2016 she was the first recipient of the Baker-Nord Distinguished Research Professor in the Humanities Award. Neils has also been a visiting professor at the University of California, Berkeley, and Johns Hopkins University.

Neils is an authority on the art of ancient Greece, specialising in iconography. She has written extensively on Athenian vase painting and on the sculptural program of the Parthenon. In addition to two books on the Parthenon, she produced a video documenting the novel seating arrangement of the gods. She has organized two major international loan exhibitions dealing with Greek art: "Goddess and Polis: The Panathenaic Festival of Ancient Athens" (1992) and "Coming of Age in Ancient Greece: Images of Childhood from the Classical Past" (2003 with John Oakley).

Neils has received fellowships from the Alexander S. Onassis Foundation, American Academy in Rome, American Council of Learned Societies, American Numismatic Society, American Philosophical Society, American School of Classical Studies at Athens, Getty Center for the History of Art and the Humanities, National Endowment for the Humanities, and the Yale Center for British Art.

Neils has served as Vice-President for Publications of the Archaeological Institute of America, as a trustee of the American School of Classical Studies at Athens, and as an Overseer of the Gennadius Library.

== Books ==
- ΙΠΠΟΣ. Το Αλογο στην αρχαια Αθηνα / HIPPOS: The Horse in Ancient Athens, co-editor and author with S. M. Dunn, trans. M. Michalarou and I. Damanaki. Athens: American School of Classical Studies at Athens, 2022.
- AVRA An Amazing Greek Horse. Athens: Melissa, 2022.
- From Kallias to Kritias: Art in Athens in the Second Half of the Fifth Century B.C., co-author and co-editor with Olga Palagia. Berlin: de Gruyter, 2022.
- Cambridge Companion to Ancient Athens, co-author and co-editor with Dylan K. Rogers. Cambridge University Press, 2021.
- Women in the Ancient World. British Museum Press and J. Paul Getty Museum 2011. Two German editions: Die Frau in der Antike. Konrad Theiss Verlag and WBG, Stuttgart, 2012.
- The Oxford Encyclopedia of Ancient Greece and Rome, area editor for classical art and archaeology and contributor. 7 vols. Oxford University Press, 2010.
- A Concise Introduction to Ancient Greece. British Museum and University of Michigan Press, 2008. Chinese edition 2014.
- The Parthenon: From Antiquity to the Present, co-author and editor. Cambridge University Press, 2005.
- Striving for Excellence: Greek Childhood and the Olympic Spirit, co-author and editor. New York: Alexander S. Onassis Public Benefit Foundation, 2004.
- Coming of Age in Ancient Greece: Images of Childhood from the Classical Past, co-editor with John Oakley and co-author. New Haven: Yale University Press, 2003.
- The Games at Athens, Agora Picture Book 25, American School of Classical Studies at Athens, co-author with Steve Tracy, 2003.
- The Parthenon Frieze. Cambridge: Cambridge University Press, 2001. With CD Rom.
- Corpus Vasorum Antiquorum, fascicule 2 (U.S.A. 35), Cleveland Museum of Art, 2000.
- Worshipping Athena: Panathenaia and Parthenon, co-author and editor. University of Wisconsin Press, 1996. Reprint 1998
- Goddess and Polis. The Panathenaic Festival in Ancient Athens. Hood Museum of Art and Princeton University Press, 1992.
- The Youthful Deeds of Theseus, Archeologica Series, vol. 76. Rome: G. Bretschneider, 1987.
- The World of Ceramics: Masterpieces from The Cleveland Museum of Art. Co-author and editor. Cleveland: The Cleveland Museum of Art, 1982.
