= Douris (vase painter) =

5th-century BC Greek vase painter and potter

Douris' school cup

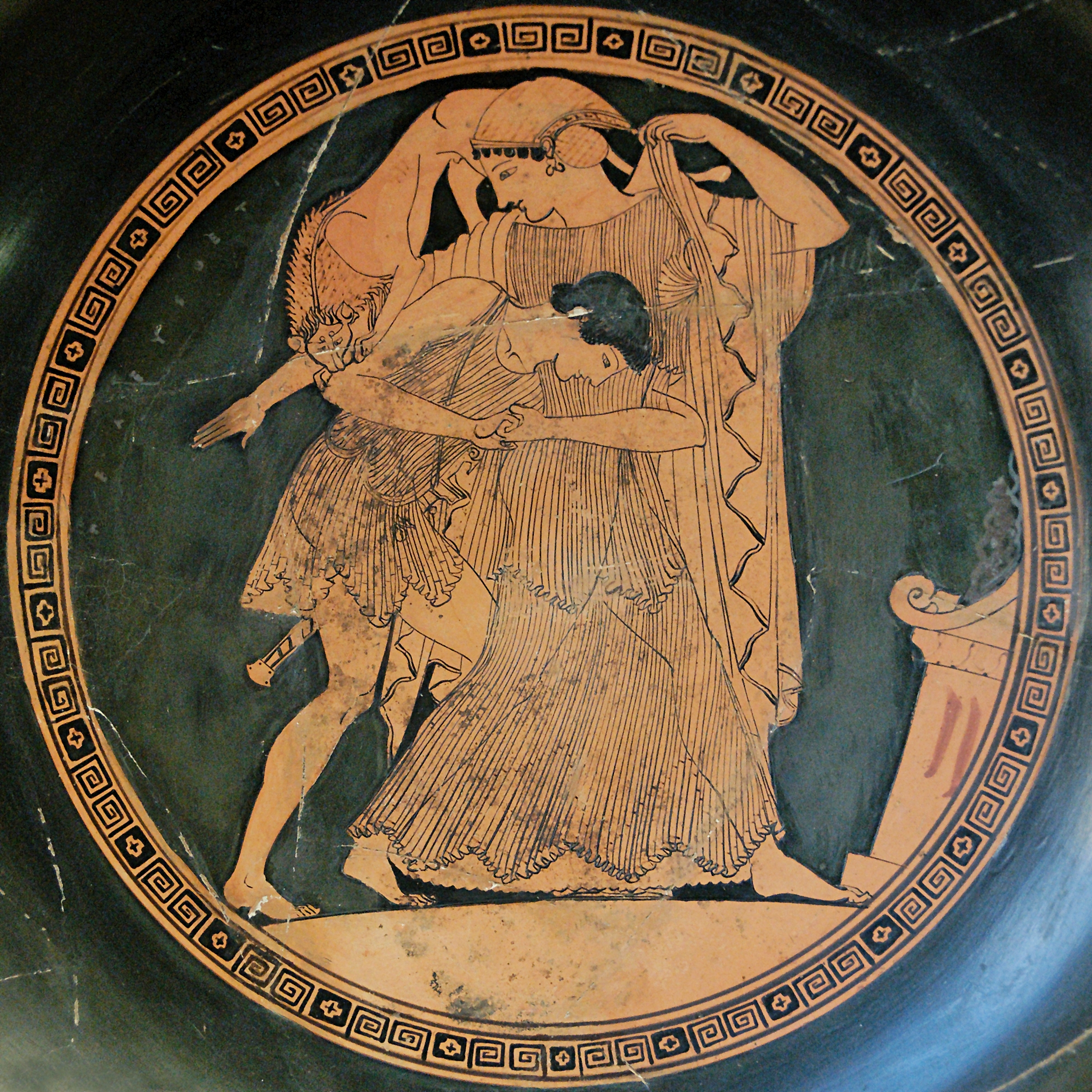
Peleus abducts Thetis, who is shape-shifting into a lioness to fight back, medallion of a cup of Phase IV, border with double meander, Cabinet des médailles, BNF (Inv. 539)

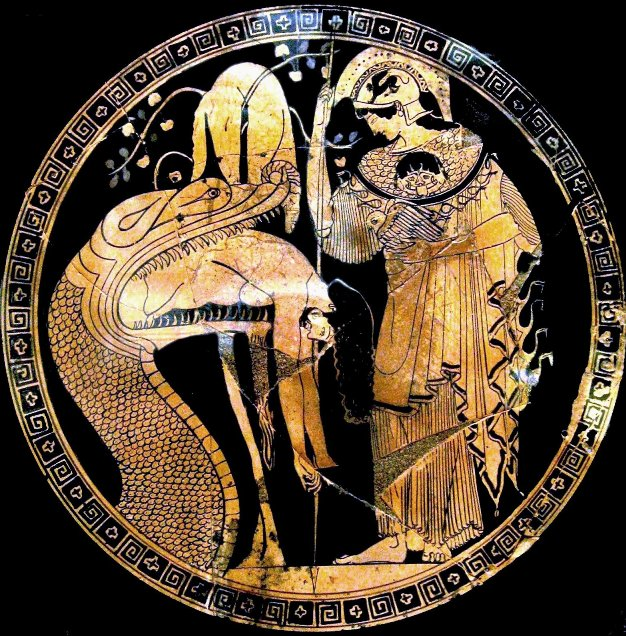
Jason being regurgitated by the dragon who keeps the Golden Fleece (center, hanging on the tree); Athena stands to the right. Red-figured kylix, c. 480–470 BC. From Cerveteri (Etruria). Vaticans Museums

Douris or Duris (Ancient Greek: Δοῦρις, Douris) was an ancient Athenian red-figure vase-painter and potter active c. 500 to 460 BCE. He is especially known for his cups or kylixes, one of which in the Antikensammlung Berlin notably shows a school scene, depicting students learning music.

== Work ==
He began his career painting for the potters Kleophrades and Euphronios, before beginning a long collaboration with the potter Python. He signed 39 vases as a painter, also one as a potter and painter, and one vase as a potter only. Between 250 and 300 vases are ascribed to him. The majority of these vases are kylixes, i.e. cups. His name seems to have been popular, since one finds it on other vases: it is reproduced on a cup by Onesimos. On the basis of these signatures, his kalos inscriptions, and of the subsidiary decoration of the vases, the art historian John Beazley divided his career into four principal periods:

=== Period 1 ===
(Very early and early) Is characterized by a full ornamentation of diverse border motifs. The preferred subjects are the symposium, the komoi (processions of drunks), and warriors. The period is marked out by the use of the kalos-inscription 'Chairestratos'. Beazley suggests that at this time Douris could have worked side by side with Onesimos in the same workshop.

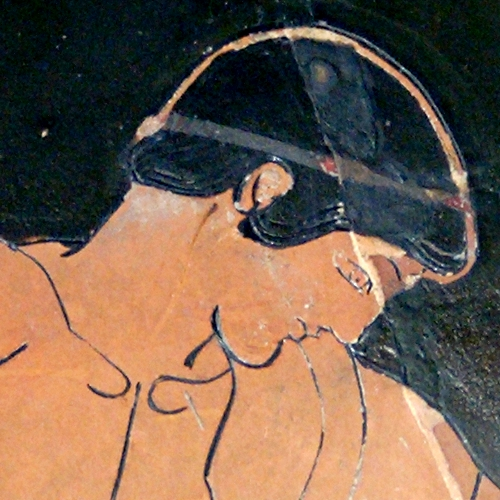
"Hook" collarbone characteristic of the style of Douris, detail of a medaillon of a cup, c. 480} BCE, Louvre (G 121).

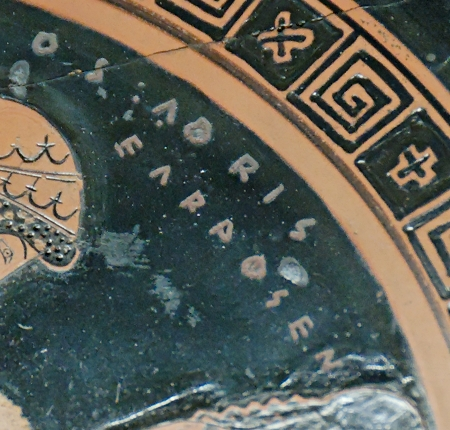
Signature of Douris ΔΟΡΙΣ ΕΓΡΑΦΣΕΝ, detail of the cup called "pieta of Memnon", c. 490-480 BCE, Louvre (G 115).

=== Period 2 ===
(Early middle) Douris' collaboration with Euphronios ends; from then on, he paints for the potter Python. Chairestratos remains the preferred kalos-inscription. Subsidiary decoration begins to recede, and the majority of the medallions do not have an edge. The favoured subjects are the scenes of youths and athletes. The hand of Douris is made clear from now on by the characteristic use of a kind of hook for the inner end of the collarbone. A characteristic piece of the period is a psykter (wine cooler) decorated with drunken satyrs, reproducing in a grotesque manner the different stages of intoxication.

=== Period 3 ===
(Middle) Douris' style is here at its most idiosyncratic. The edges of the medallion are characterized by the alternation of an element of a meander and squares; palmettes decorate the handles of the cup. The kalos-inscriptions 'Hippodamas' become prevalent; Douris' signatures become scarcer. Douris returns to the scenes of the symposium, and to depictions of warriors and school-scenes. A characteristic piece of this period is the cup known as of the "pieta of Memnon": Eos carries the body of her son Memnon, killed by Achilles during the Trojan War.

=== Period 4 ===
(Late) Douris returns to a full ornamentation. The borders sometimes retain the period-3 ('Hippodamas-type') border of alternating stopped meanders and saltire crosses, but gradually revert to the common type; the palmettes on the handles become complicated and of the motifs of the lotus appear in parallel. Douris' signatures disappear altogether and the kalos-inscriptions decrease in frequency; one finds 'Polyphrasmon' and 'HIketes'. The drawing quality degenerates in grace and force.

== Sources ==
- John Beazley, "Attic Red-figure Vase-painters". Second edition, Oxford: The Clarendon Press, 1963.
- John Boardman. Athenian Red Figure Vases: The Archaic Period: A Handbook. London: Thames and Hudson, 1975.
- Diana Buitron-Oliver. Douris. A Master-Painter of Athenian Red-Figure Vases. (in Kerameus, Vol. 9, 2005, online
- Edmond Pottier and Jane Ellen Harrison (translated by Bettina Kahnweiler). Douris and the Painters of Greek Vases. London: J. Murray, 1908.
- The Getty Museum - Biography of Douris
