= Kottabos =

Target game played by ancient Greeks and Etruscans

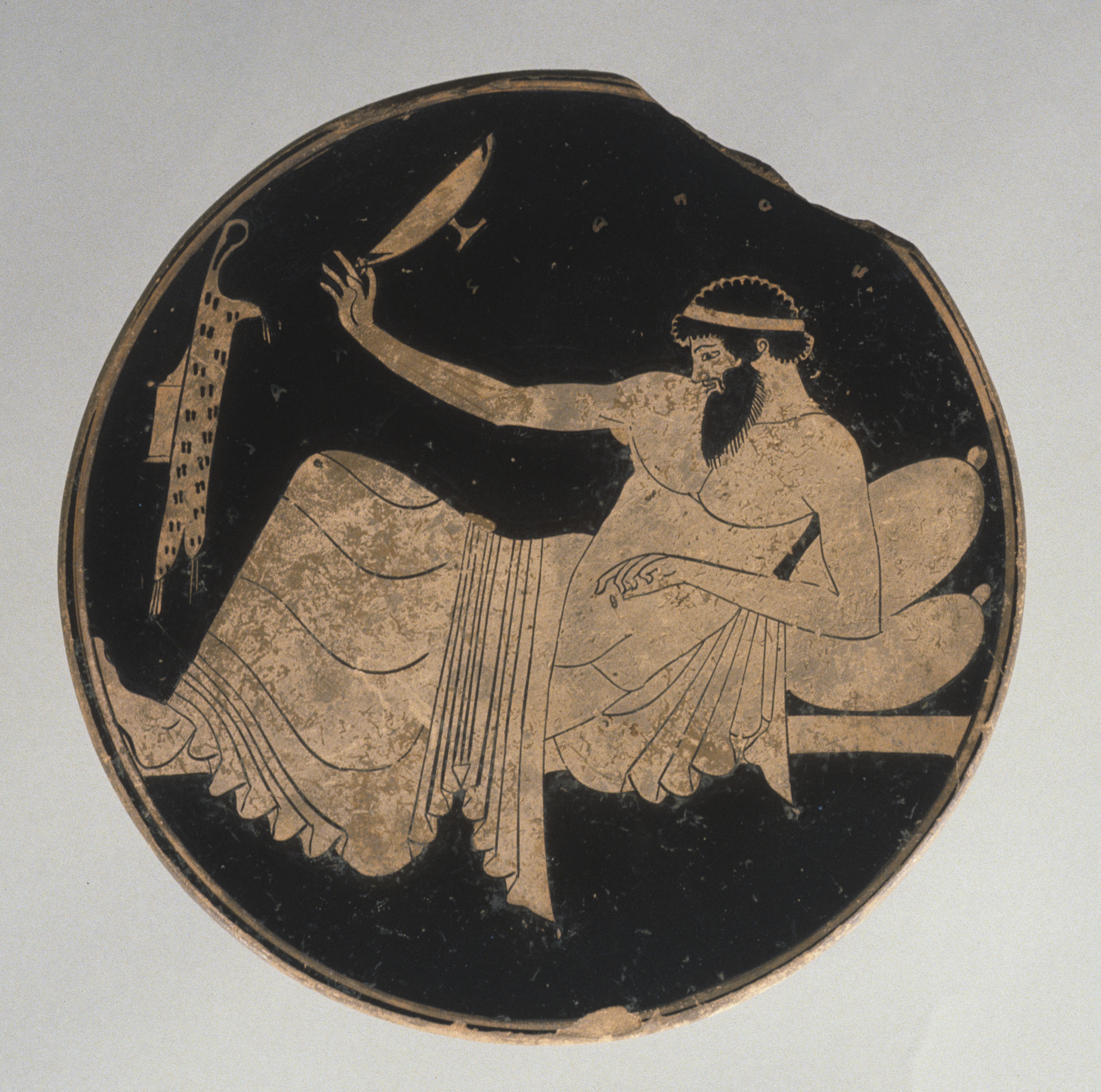
Kottabos player, red-figure plate, c. 500 BC, Bryn Mawr College

Kottabos (Ancient Greek: κότταβος) was a game of skill played at Ancient Greek and Etruscan symposia (drinking parties), especially in the 6th and 5th centuries BC. It involved flinging wine lees at a target in the middle of the room. The winner would receive a prize (κοττάβιον or "kottabion"), comprising cakes, sweetmeats, or kisses.

Ancient writers, including Dionysius Chalcus, Alcaeus, Anacreon, Pindar, Bacchylides, Aeschylus, Sophocles, Euripides, Aristophanes, and Antiphanes, make frequent and familiar allusion to the practice; and it is depicted on contemporaneous red-figure vases. References to the practice by the writers of the Roman and Alexandrian periods show that the fashion had died out. In Latin literature, it is almost entirely unknown.

Dexterity was required to succeed in the game, and unusual ability was rated as highly as corresponding excellence in throwing the javelin. Kottabos was customary, and, at least in Sicily, special circular buildings were established, so the players might easily be arranged around the target, and follow each other in rapid succession. Like all games in which the element of chance found a place, it was regarded as more or less ominous of the future success of the players, especially in matters of love – and the excitement was sometimes further augmented by some object of value being staked on the event, for instance the opportunity to engage in relations with a servant attending to the symposium.

== Origin ==
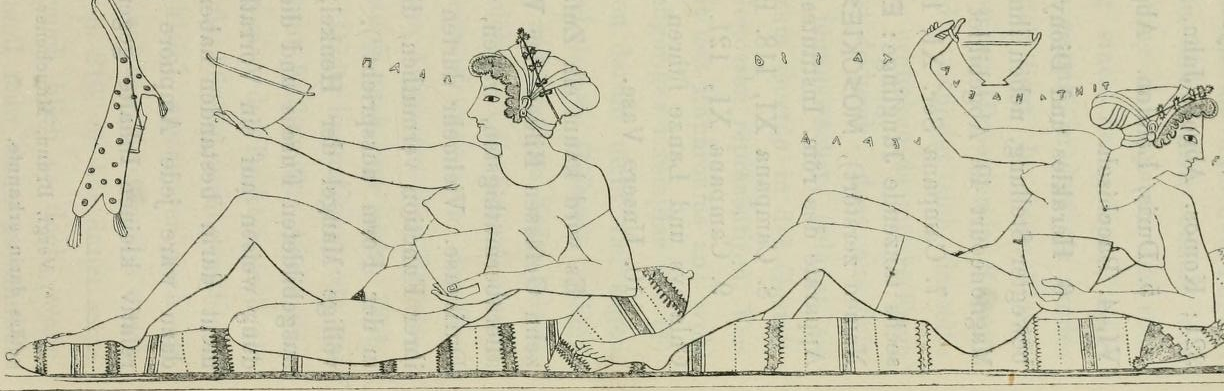
Attic red-figure psykter, by Euphronios, c. 520 BC

The kottabos game seems to have originated in Sicily, or the land of the Sikels, but it spread through Greece, from Thessaly to Rhodes, becoming especially fashionable at Athens. Evidence of its origin can be found on an Attic red-figure psykter by Euphronios, depicting four hetairai. One of the hetairai on the vase, Smikra, is swinging her cup, as a kottabos player. The inscription beside her is Doric, the dialect used by the Sicilians.

== Rules of play ==
As Antiphanes wrote in his play: "the kottabos player puts the index finger of the right-hand through the handle of the drinking cup, palm upwards; and the remaining fingers are spread as playing a flute." The player reclines on the couch, leaning on the left elbow; and, moving only the right-forearm, throws the wine-lees.

== Kottabos kataktos ==
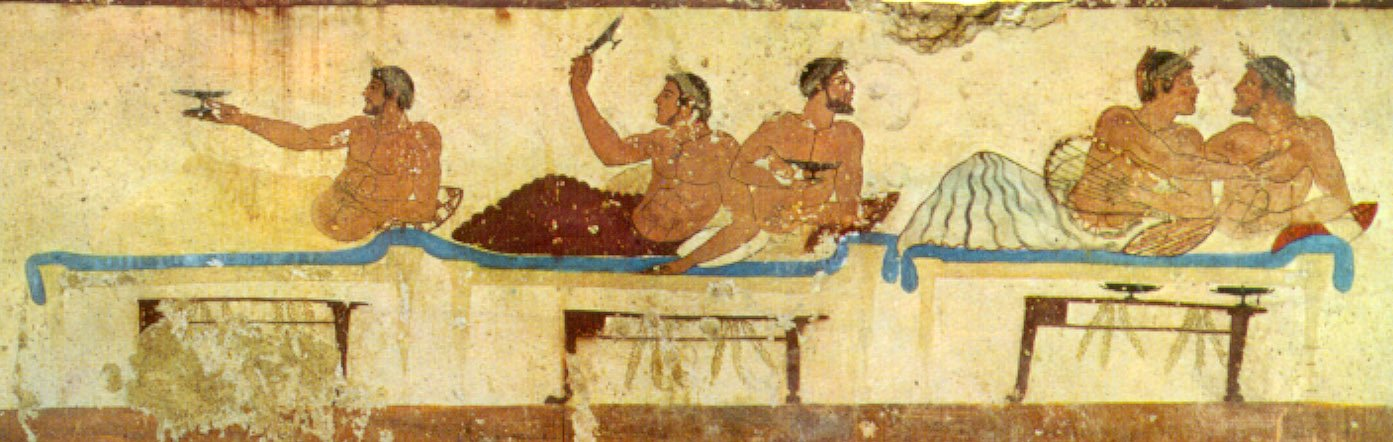
Symposium scene with kottabos player (center). Fresco from the Tomb of the Diver, 475 BC. Paestum National Museum, Italy.

When playing kottabos kataktos, also called kottabos with a pole, the target is the plastinx (πλάστιγξ), a small disc, balanced horizontally atop a bronze lamp stand. Halfway down the stand is a larger disc called the manes (μάνης). Sometimes a bronze statuette is used, with the plastinx balanced on its extended arms, or on its head. Some refer to this statuette as the manes, since Manes was a Phrygian slave name; and it would make sense to connect that name with this small figure. But according to Antiphanes, the plastinx should fall onto the manes with a loud noise, which seems unlikely if the manes is the statuette. (Note: since the plastinx would likely only graze it.) The player is expected to throw the wine-lees found in the drinking cup, in such a way that it does not break bulk in its passage through the air, towards the plastinx. Success entails making the plastinx fall to the manes, causing a bell-like sound. Both the wine thrown, and the noise made, were called latax (λάταξ).

== Variations ==
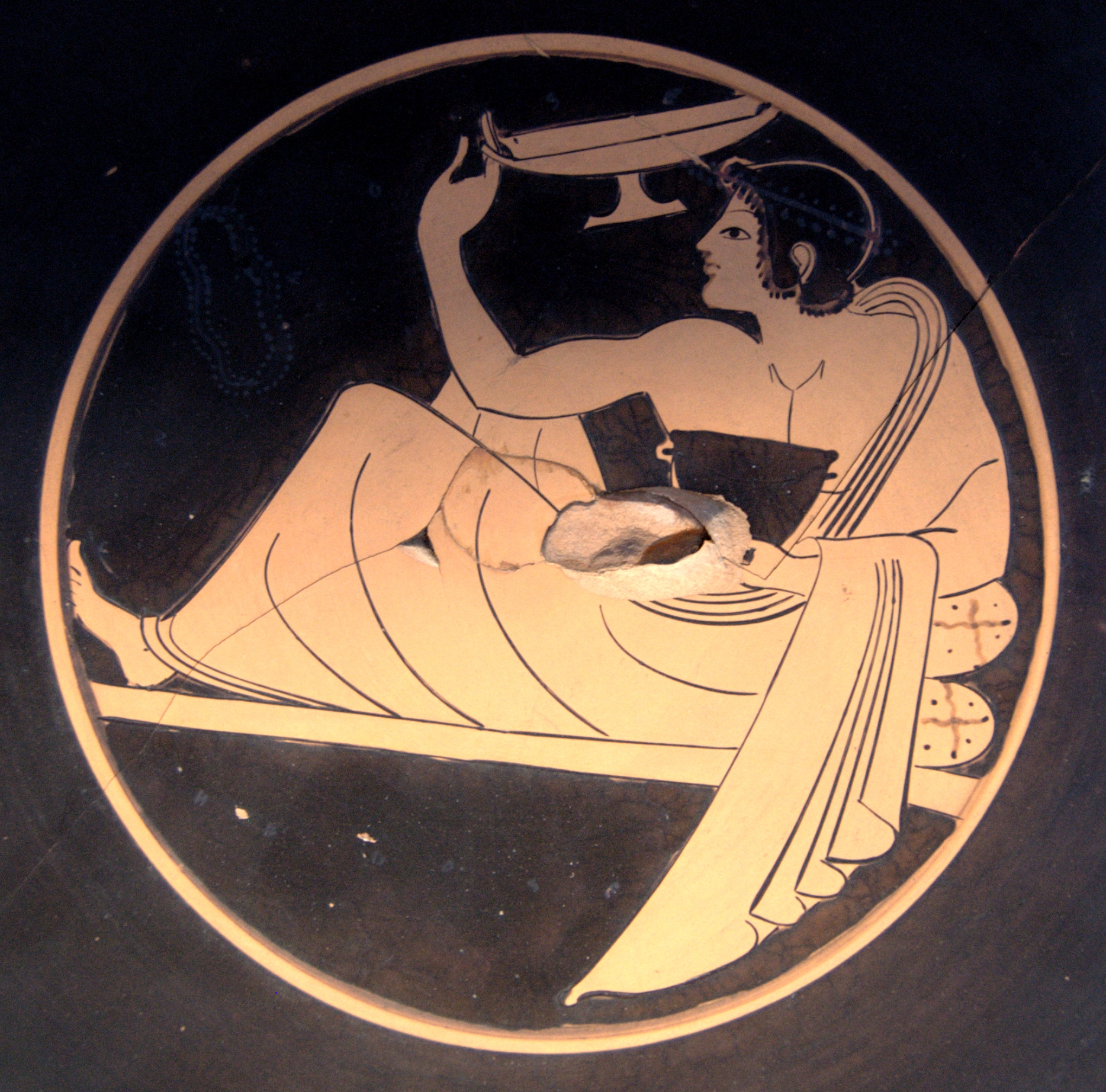
Kottabos player; red-figure Attic kylix. Louvre, Paris.

Kottabos kataktos was the traditional and correct way of playing, but there were various modifications that were acceptable:

=== Kottabos with oxybapha ===
In Kottabos with an oxybaphon (Κότταβος δι᾽ ὀξυβάφων), or kottabos in a bowl, the target of the throw is a bowl, or lekane. The lekane is filled with water, and empty shallow saucers (ὀξύβαφα or oxybapha) float on the water. The object is to throw the wine-lees onto the oxybapha, to sink them, which is easier than the kottabos kataktos. The player who sank the most was the winner. This form of playing is rarely found on vases, presumably because it would be difficult to paint the interior of the lekane, with oxybapha floating in it, on a vase.

=== Combination of kataktos and oxybapha ===
There is a special kottabos stand found in Italy, Etruscan with a pole and a bowl at the bottom. It combines the kottabos kataktos with the variation involving oxybapha. The lower was probably the lekane used to float the oxybapha, while the pole can be used to play the original form.

=== Sunken kottabos ===
Sunken kottabos (Κότταβος κατακτός) is not so simple. The apparatus (kottabeion, pl. kottabeia) were the rhabdus (ῥάβδος, a bronze pole), the plastinx (πλάστιγξ, a small saucer like that on a balance), the lecanis (λεκανίς, a large saucer), and the manes (μάνης, a bronze figurine).

The discovery in Etruscan burial sites (by Wolfgang Helbig in 1886) of two sets of actual apparatus in Umbria, near Perugia, as well as various representations on Greek vases help explain the somewhat obscure accounts (Note: These accounts, contained in the writings of various Greek and Roman authors, should not be assumed as entirely accurate since they were written at a time when kottabos had, in fact, become obsolete) of how kottabos was played.

The rhabdus (pole) had a flat base, and the main structure tapered towards the top, with a blunt end (on which the plastinx or manes was balanced). The plastinx (small saucer) had a hole near the edge and was slightly concave in the middle.

About two-thirds of the way down, the rhabdus was encircled by the lecanis (large saucer). A socket near the top of the rhabdus held the manes (figurine). The manes was in the shape of a man, with his right arm and leg uplifted, sometimes holding a drinking horn (or "rhytum").

According to Helbig, three games (Note: A fourth method, in which a set of scales was barraged with wine so that each side of the scale would dip down and touch an image placed underneath, probably never existed and was conceived by a confusion of the plastinx with a scale-pan by reason of its name (which also means "scale" in Greek).) were played with this apparatus:

==== Method No. 1 ====
The plastinx (small saucer) was fixed on top of the rhabdus (pole), with the lecanis (large saucer) below. The players tried to fill the plastinx with enough wine to tip it over (with a crash) onto the lecanis.

==== Method No. 2 ====
Played exactly the same as method No. 1, except that the plastinx was supposed to hit the manes (figurine) on the way down to the lecanis.

==== Method No. 3 ====
Played exactly the same as method No. 1, except that the manes (instead of the plastinx) was fixed on top of the rhabdus, and it was at this that the wine was thrown.

=== Kottabos with a phallus-headed bird ===
Another variation of the kottabos involves a different kind of target. On a red-figure cup by Apollodoros, it shows some symposiasts aiming at a target with a phallus-headed bird balancing on top of a tripod which is placed on a flat pan. The pan is inscribed KOTABOS, so it is certain which game is played. This target is unique, and it emphasizes the erotic side of both the game and the symposium.

== Kottabos toast ==
Before the kottabos player throws the wine-lees, the turn is dedicated to a lover. The player's words can be a sort of toast or dedication to the person of affection. The toast can serve as a question about the possibility of success in love, which would be answered by the outcome of the throw. It emphasizes the love nature of this game, and the core idea of bonding at the symposium.

One of the most famous inscriptions is on the red-figure psykter of the four hetairai by Euphronios. On this psykter, Smikra is dedicating her turn to Leagros. The inscription says: "Tin tande latasso leagre (I am throwing this for you, Leagros)." Leagros was a popular youth frequently named in kalos inscriptions on sympotic vases around this period.

Sometimes painters would use gods as representations of a kottabos player when giving a kottabos toast. On a red-figure stamnos by the Copenhagen painter, Dionysus is painted as one of these representations. The inscription beside his arm says: "tot tende (this is for you)." On the left, a satyr completes the sentence: "lykoi (for Lykos)", who was a youth popular at the time, and known from other inscriptions. Apparently, the god is used as a mouthpiece for a human to speak of his affection.

On another red-figure cup, the inscription, "ho pais kalos (the youth is beautiful)", seems to spring out from the player's cup, and follow the trajectory of the wine that is being thrown.

Kottabos involves disruption of equilibrium when the plastinx falls, or the oxybapha are sunk. This break in equilibrium symbolizes the uncertainty a person may feel when a lover is present. So when balance is broken, the sound of the plastinx falling onto the manes, and the sunk of the oxybapha, serves as a good omen, indicating that the love of the player is assured. The successful play of the kottabos game would represent success when pursuing love or being loved by young men and women.

== Female Kottabos players ==
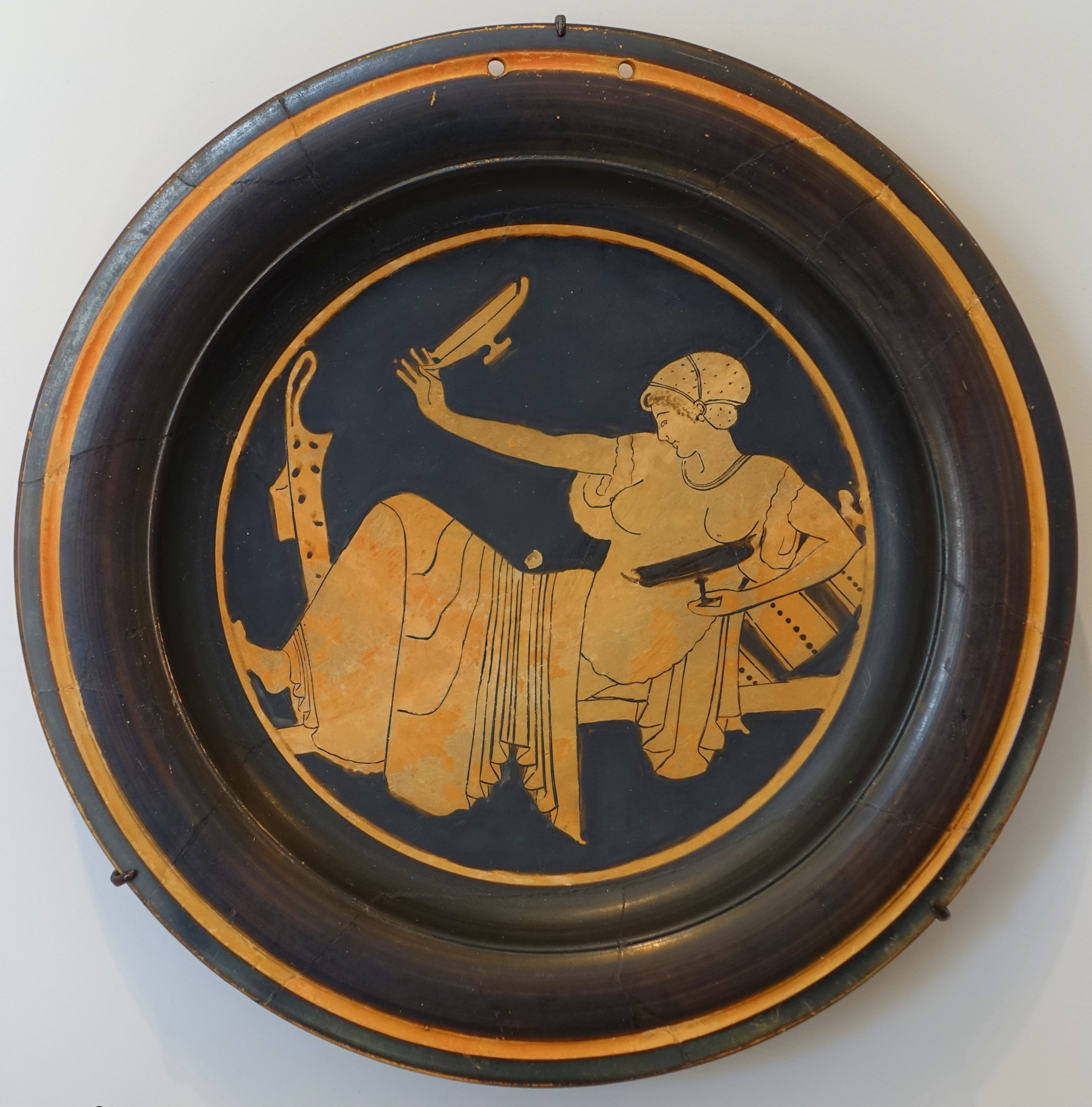
Woman playing kottabos, plate, by the Bryn Mawr Painter, Attic Greek, c. 480 BC. Sackler Museum, Harvard University.

Women were not usually the recipient of the kottabos toast, so a scene depicting women kottabos players, like the four hetairai by Euphronios, naming a popular youth as the subject of the toast, might be a joke. Another interpretation of the four hetairai is that these female symposiasts are Spartans. This would account for the Doric dialect used on the inscription and also the absence of couches, which is consistent with the stereotypes about Sparta held by the Athenians. The use of female symposiasts as a humorous trope is consistent with several black-figure vases with figures that are interpreted as Etruscan women. As with Spartan women, they were considered to be uncivilized.

== Kottabos cup in Oxford ==
Most of the cups being used to play the kottabos game were regular kylikes as shown on painted pots. But there is a unique kottabos cup in Oxford: instead of a regular foot, this cup has a conical-shaped projection at the bottom. It is said to be a cup customized for playing the kottabos. Wear on the handles accords with the way a kottabos player would employ the cup. With its special foot, it would be conveniently carried as a personal kottabos cup to symposiums.

== See also ==
- List of drinking games
