= Pistoxenos Painter =

Ancient Greek vase painter

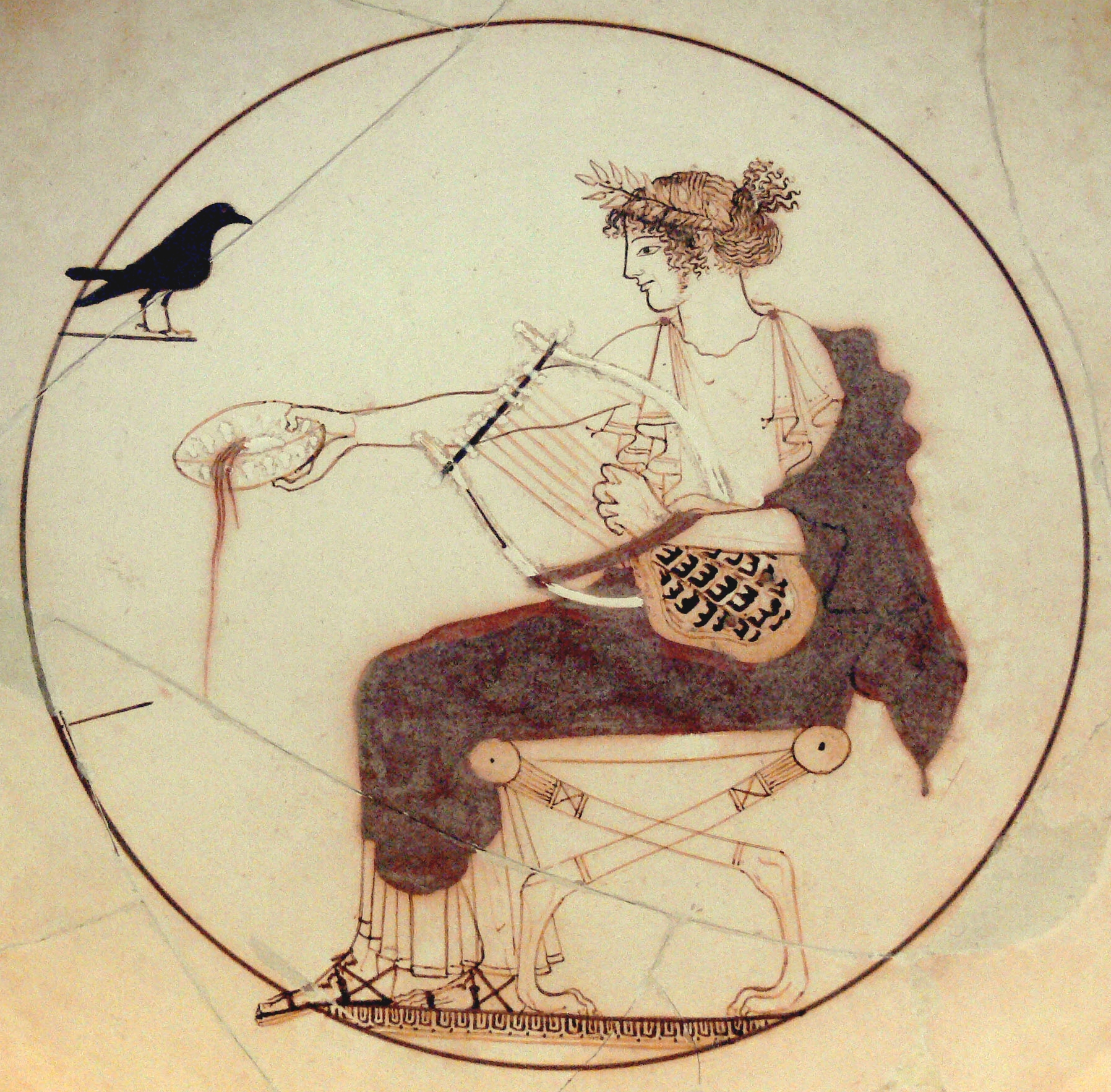
Cylix of Apollo with chelys lyre and his raven, pouring libation, white-ground bowl, circa 480 BC. Delphi, Archaeological Museum.

The Pistoxenos Painter was an important ancient Greek vase painter of the Classical period. He was active in Athens between c. 480 and 460 BC. Many vases have been attributed to his hand on the basis of style.

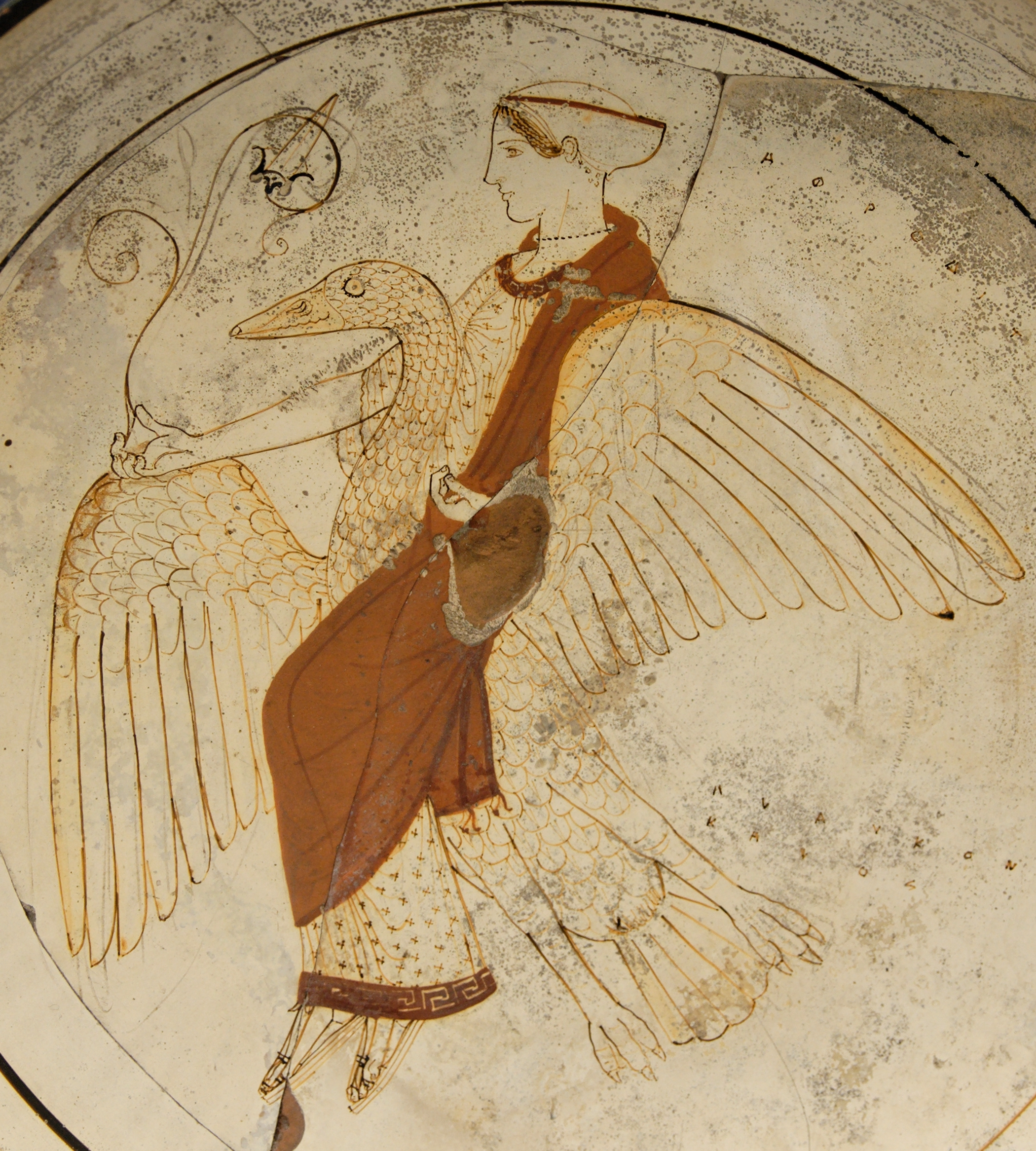
Aphrodite riding a goose, white-ground bowl, circa 480 BC. Found at Kameiros (Rhodes), now British Museum.

John Beazley gave him the name from a skyphos now at Schwerin with a signature indicating that it was made by the potter Pistoxenos. It depicts Iphikles being taught music by Linos, and Heracles accompanied by his tattooed Thracian servant Geropso.

The Pistoxenos Painter probably started his apprenticeship under the Antiphon Painter in the workshop of Euphronios. He specialized in kylikes, which he painted in the red-figure style, bringing "the delicacy of Late Archaic vase-painting into the Early Classical style". Some of his best pieces, however, were produced in the white ground technique. The most important motifs of his paintings are horses, warriors and thiasos imagery.

He was one of the first painters to employ four-colour polychromy, using slip, paints and gilding. This style often resembles monumental painting. In his later works he grew so skillful that he could omit the "relief line". Stylistically, he is close to the Penthesilea Painter. His kalos inscriptions refer to the names Lysis, Glaukon and Megakles.
