= Beth Cohen =

Beth Cohen may refer to:

- Beth Cohen (archaeologist)
- Beth Cohen (musician)
