= Cylix of Apollo =

Ancient Greek kylix

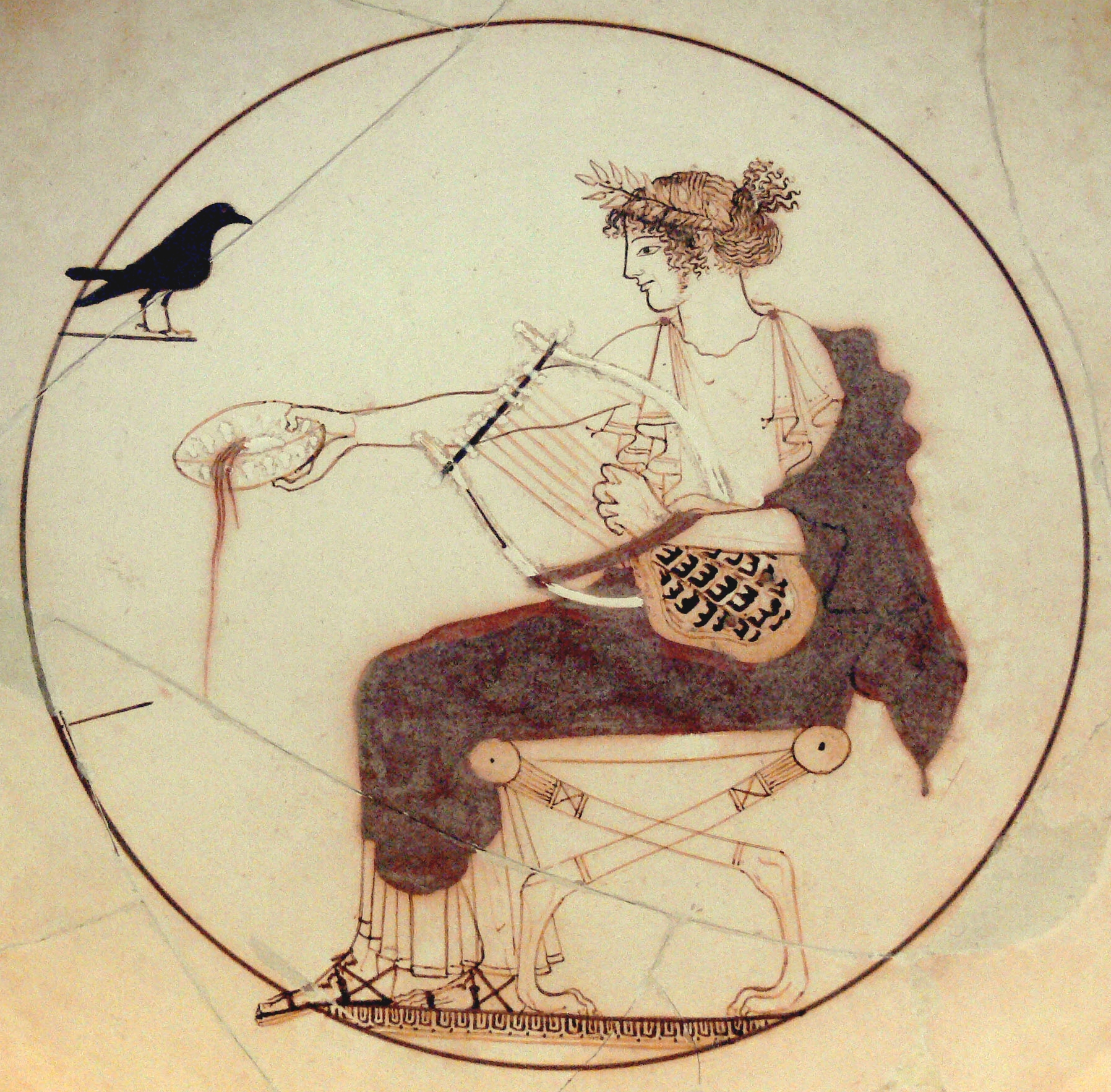
White ground, Attic, c. 460, Apollo pours a libation, detail.

The Cylix of Apollo is a kylix, or shallow drinking bowl, made in an Attic workshop around 460 BCE. It has an unusual depiction of the god Apollo done in the white-ground red-figure technique and is one of the few pieces of pottery on display at the Delphi Archaeological Museum. It was found in a grave near the museum, believed to be that of a priest.

== Description ==
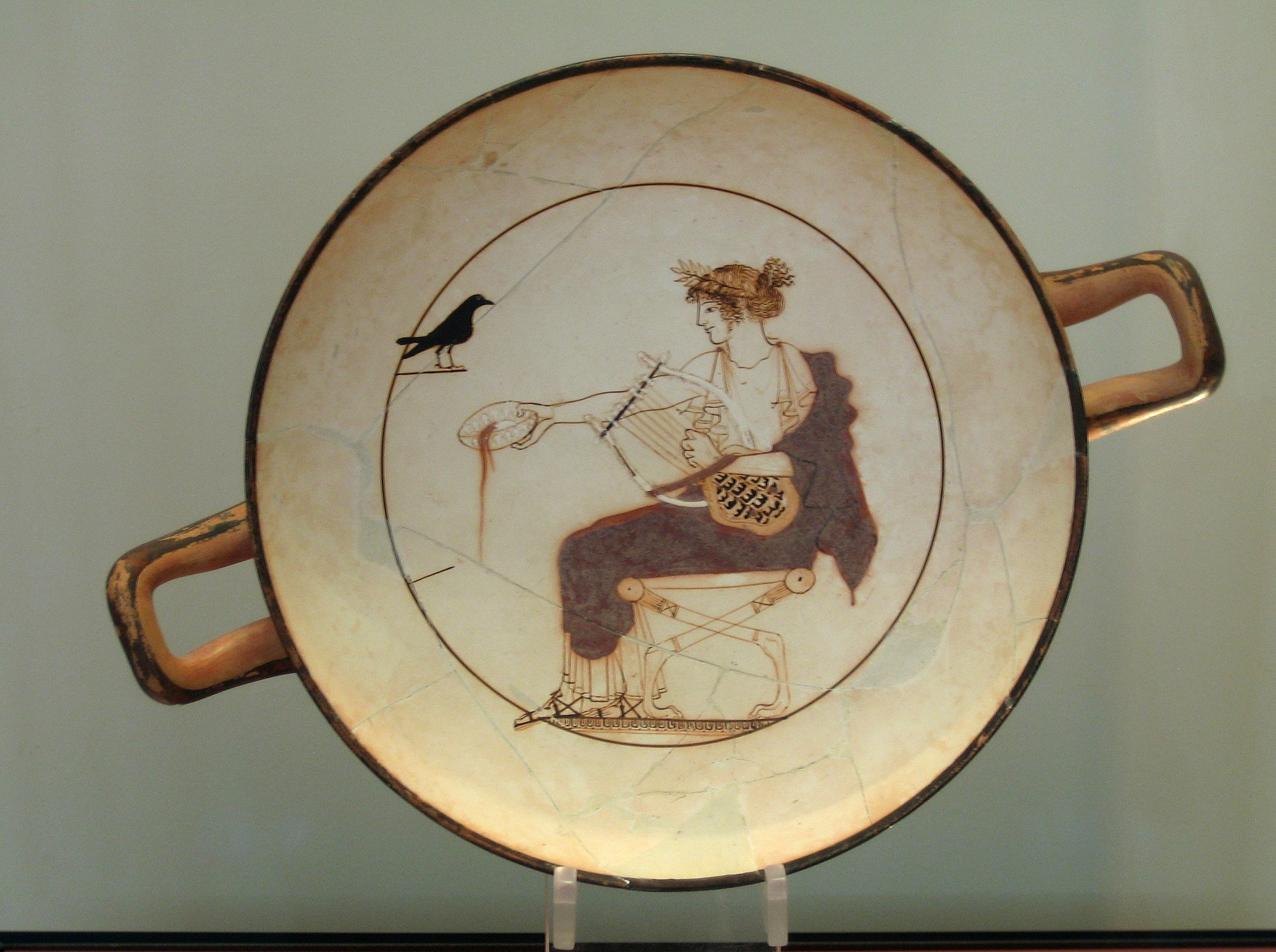
The whole bowl, from above

Inside the cylix Apollo is depicted with an elaborate hairdo and a laurel wreath on his head, sitting on a chair, the legs of which end in lion's paws. The god wears a white chiton, a red cloak (himation) and sandals. A seven-stringed lyre is attached to his left hand with a red strap, whereas with his right hand he pours a libation out of a shallow bowl (patera) decorated with patterns in relief. Opposite the god is a black bird, for which several explanations have been offered: it is identified either as an oracular bird or as a crow which brought to Apollo the message that his beloved Koronis, daughter of king Phlegyas, was getting married.

Its creator remains uncertain. It has been tentatively identified as by Euphronios or one of his followers; other scholars have suggested it resembles the work of the Pistoxenos Painter.

== Bibliography ==
- Kolonia, R., 2006, The archaeological museum of Delphi, Athens
- Amandry, P., Chamoux, P., 1991, Guide de Delphes: Le musée, pp. 231–233
