= Kylix depicting athletic combats by Onesimos =

Ceramic drinking cup made approximately in the late Archaic period

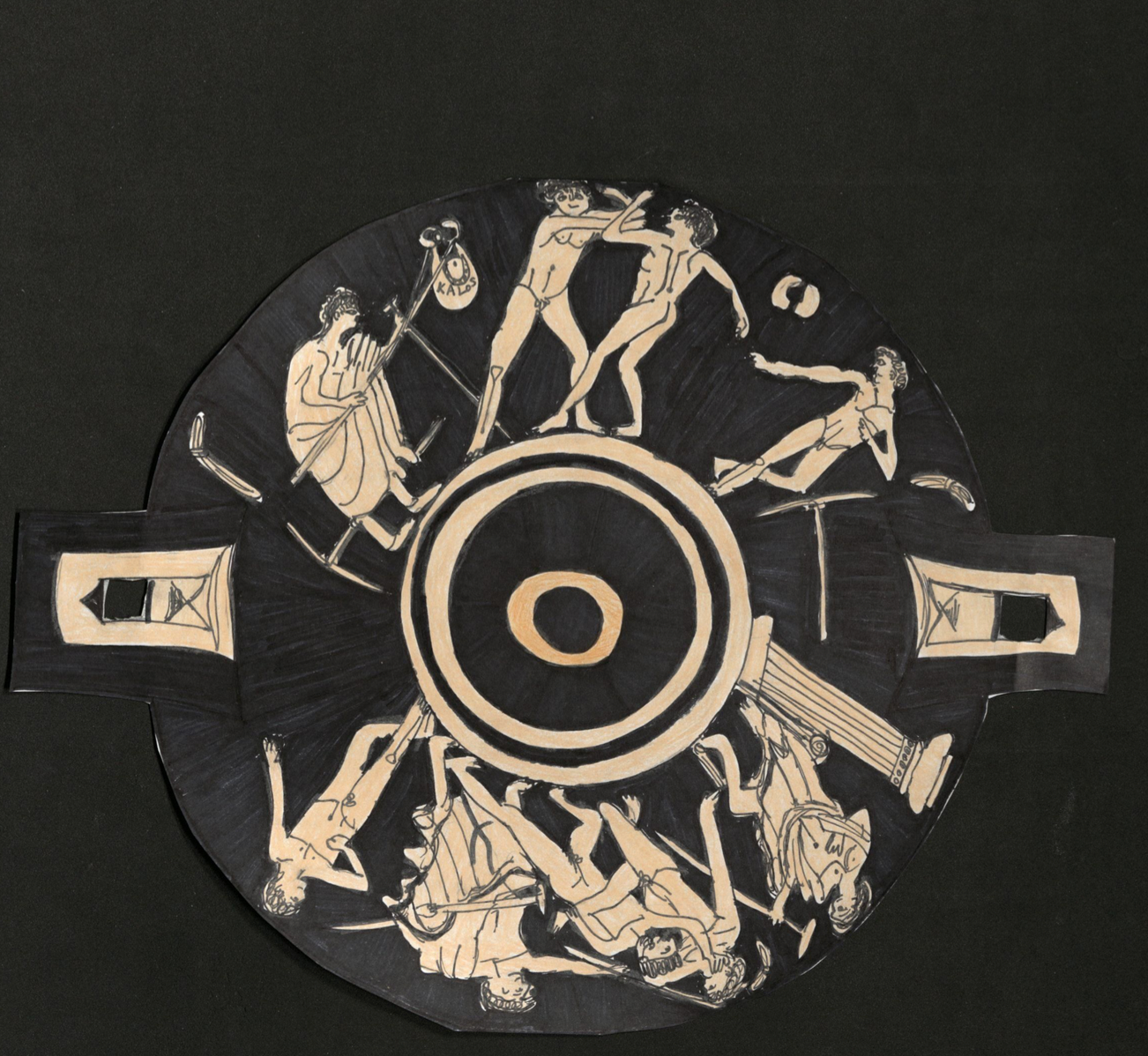
Exterior sides of drinking cup (kylix) depicting athletic combats (drawing)

Tondo of drinking cup (kylix) depicting athletic combats (drawing)

The kylix depicting athletic combats is a ceramic drinking cup made approximately in the late Archaic period, 490 B.C., in Attica. It is currently in the Museum of Fine Arts Boston as part of The Ancient World Collections. The artist, Onesimos, used red-figure technique for the decoration, which was invented in Athens around 530 B.C. and quickly became one of the leading modes of decoration Athenian potters used. Red-figure technique was favored because it allowed for a greater representation of garments, emotions and anatomy making it useful for artists, such as Onesimos, to use in painting athletic events.

== Onesimos ==
Onesimos was an artist who worked in Athens from 500 to 480 B.C. His name means "profitable" and it is speculated that is could have been a nickname His name is known because of a cup that was found which also held the signature of the potter Euphronios. He almost exclusively painted cups and he favored realistic portrayals of the human body often painting athletic events and other activities that allowed for him to depict active poses.

== Depictions ==
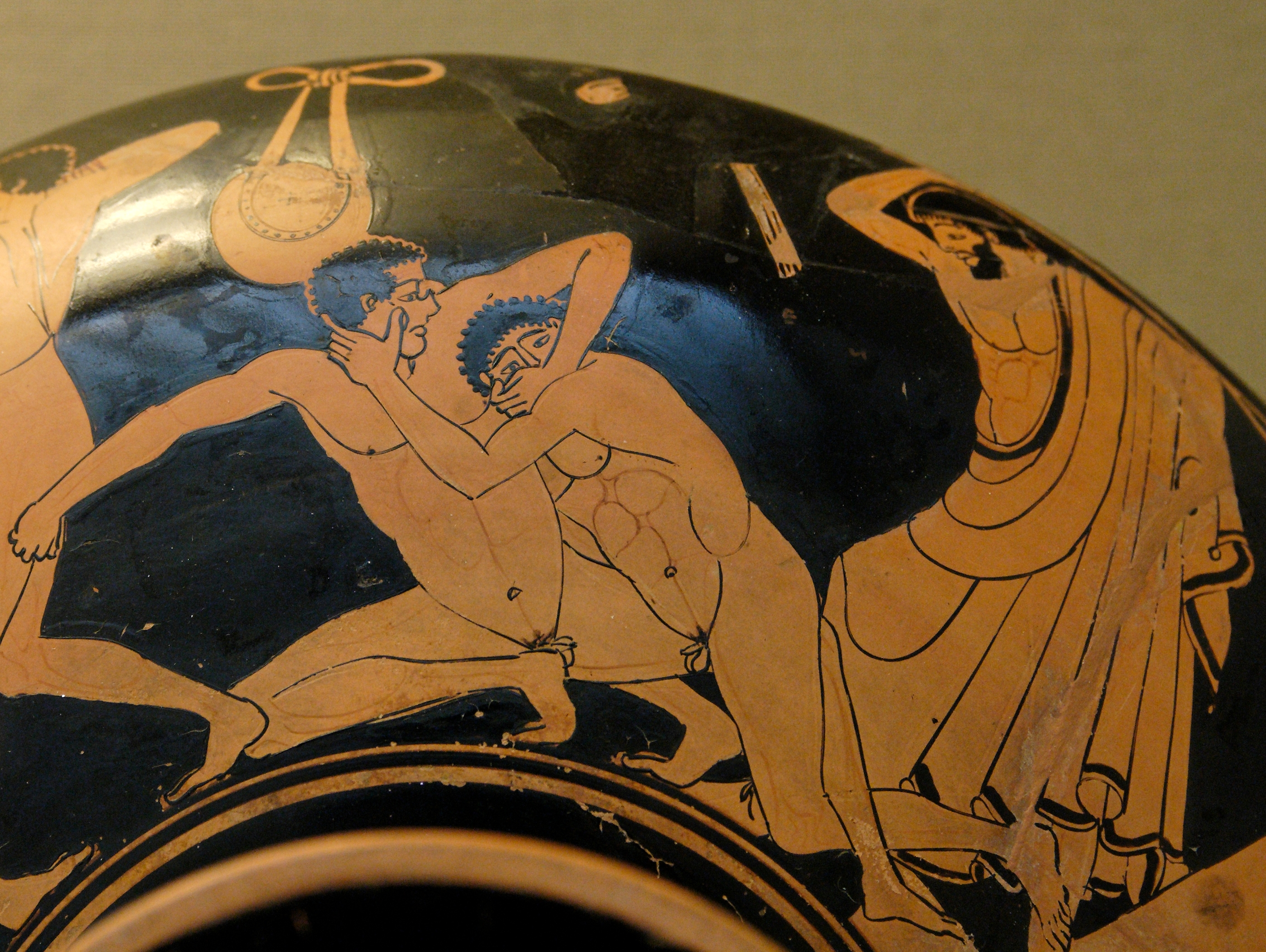
Pancration Foul Scene by the Foundry Painter

The exterior sides of this kylix holds depictions for two athletic events: the pancration and a wrestling match. The pancration was a popular athletic event in Ancient Greece and was introduced in 648 BCE to the Olympic Games. The word pancration can be broken down into pan meaning all and kratos meaning strength or power and it was a form of ancient martial arts that combined both wrestling and boxing. In Onesimos' depiction of the pancration there are two young boys wrestling, their youth evident from their lack of facial hair, and there are two trainers, one on either side of them. One trainer is standing and the other is sitting next to a column that is holding what appears to be a prize cauldron. There is also another young boy standing next to the standing trainer. Scenes of the pancration were common among red-figure vessels depicting athletic events as is seen by the pancration scene by the Foundry Painter.

The other athletic event depicted is boxing. There are also two young boys with no facial hair engaged in the athletic act with the one on the left facing frontally towards the viewer. They being observed by a trainer on the left with a staff and staves in his hand and another young boy on the right. The boy standing on the right observing the young boxers appears to be in a stance of measuring the field and is also a mirror image of the boy observing in the pancration scene. In the background around the scene there are different objects that would typically be used in athletic events such as a two mattocks, a discus bag which appears to be on a wall, and jumping weights.

The tondo or the interior of this kylix holds an image on a youth holding a hare. His face is frontal facing the viewer and he is wearing a himation or a cloak around his shoulders and there is a walking stick in the background.

== Inscriptions ==
On the pancration scene there is one inscription that reads "Panaitios kalos" which is translated to "Panaitios is handsome". In many of his kalos inscriptions, Onesimos uses the name Panaitios which misled many to believe that there was a Panaitios Painter whose work was earlier than Onesimos. It is now accepted, however, that the Panaitos Painter and Onesimos are the same. In the boxing scene there are two inscriptions; one reading "Lukos kalos" or "Lykos is handsome" and the other on the discus bag reading "Kalos" or "handsome". The final inscription is found in the tondo and it reads "Ho pais kalos" or "The boy is handsome".

== Connection between kylixes and athletic training ==
Greek kylixes and other vessels during the Archaic period frequently depicted activities such as athletic training events that were favored by their users, the majority of which were part of the aristocracy. Kylixes where often used at symposiums which were all male drinking parties. Symposiums were considered an integral part of Greek culture and was an activity reserved for only the most elite of society. The party was held in a private home where the men would get together to drink, eat, sing and discuss various topics such as philosophy and politics; the only women who were allowed to attend were high-class entertainers. It was an activity that served to reinforce the status and bond of the aristocracy. Athletic events were also an important part of Greek culture as they believed in the importance of training their bodies just as much as they trained their minds. The Grecian youths of elite families would train under athletic trainers at a palaestra or a wrestling school. These training sessions where a key part of youth socialization in society.

== See also ==
- Wine accessory
- Wine tasting
