= Onesimos (vase painter) =

Athenian vase painter, active c. 500–480 BC

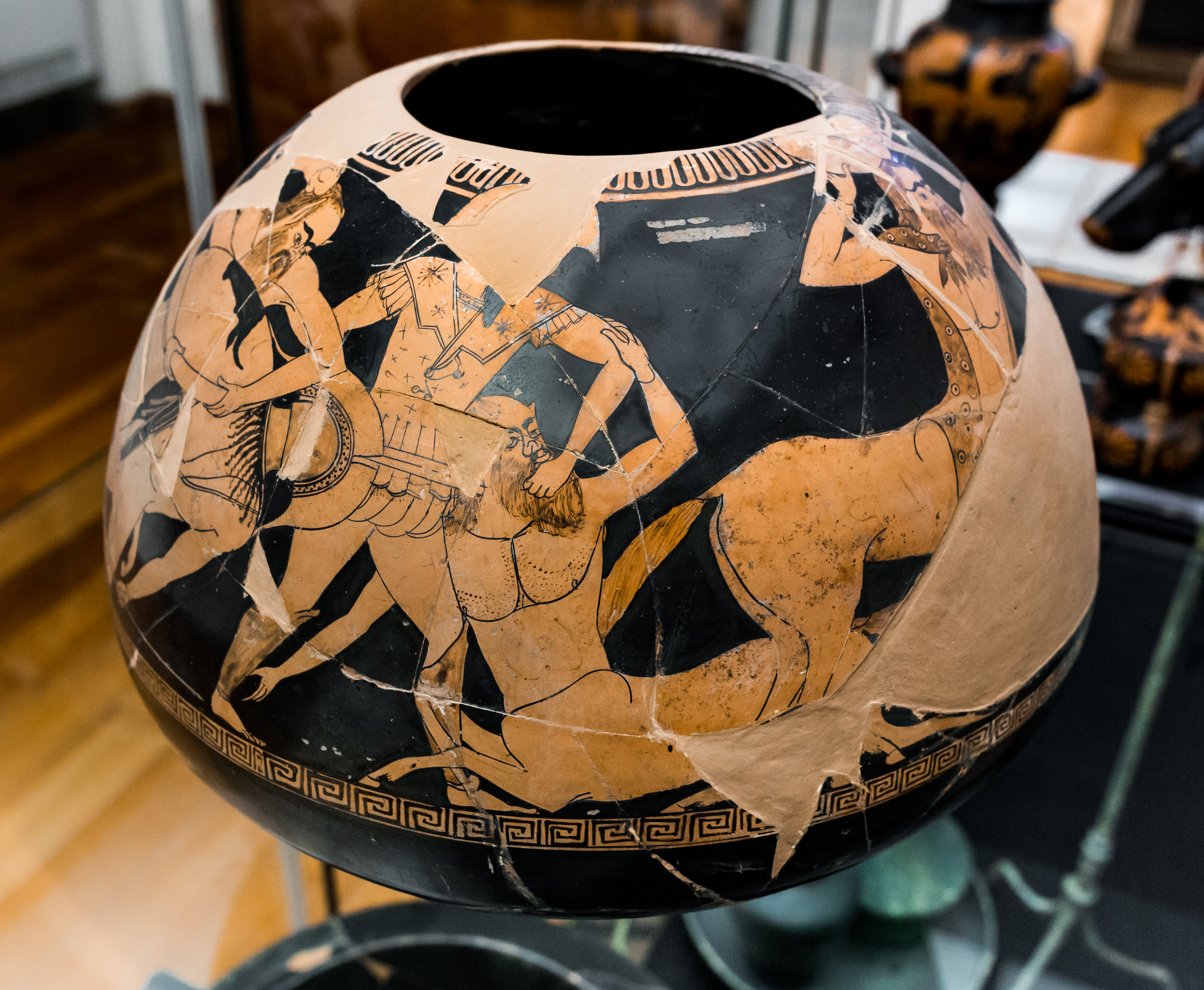
- Onesimos, centauromachy on a red-figure psykter (c. 500–475 BC), Villa Giulia, Rome
- Born: c. 500–480 BC; Athens, Greece
- Movement: Red-figure, Early Classical

Onesimos was an ancient Athenian vase painter who flourished c. 500–480 BC. He specialized in decorating cups, mostly of Type B, which comprise virtually all known examples of his work.

Like many of his fellow red-figure painters, Onesimos emphasized realistically rendered, active figures, and depicted tableaux drawn from daily life as well as scenes from mythology. A number of the pieces painted by Onesimos bear the signature of Euphronios as potter. In light of this evidence of the two artists' close collaboration, as well as similarities in their painting styles, many researchers believe that Onesimos learned his trade as Euphronios's pupil. Similarly, the works of the later Antiphon Painter bear a close stylistic resemblance to those of Onesimos, suggesting that Onesimos may have served as a teacher in his own right.

Onesimos is the topic of a doctoral monograph by Dr. Ollie Croker of the University of Oxford.

== See also ==
- Kylix depicting athletic combats by Onesimos
