= Diana Buitron-Oliver =

American classical archaeologist and curator (1946–2002)

- Born: Diana Buitron; 17 April 1946
- Died: 29 April 2002 (aged 56); Washington, D.C., U.S.
- Occupations: Archaeologist, curator
- Known for: Greek vase painting

Diana Buitron-Oliver (17 April 1946 – 29 April 2002) was an American classical archaeologist and curator, specializing in Greek vase painting.

== Life ==
Buitron-Oliver began her university studies at Smith College in Northampton, Massachusetts and later studied under German-American art historian Dietrich von Bothmer at the Institute of Fine Arts at New York University. She completed her doctoral thesis in 1976 on the vase paintings of the Greek painter Douris (c. 500-460 BC).

=== Curator ===
From 1977 to 1984, she succeeded Dorothy Kent Hill as curator at the Antiquities Department of the Walters Art Museum in Baltimore. Later, she worked on two exhibitions at the National Gallery of Art in Washington D.C.: "The Human Figure in Early Greek Art" (1987–88) and "The Greek Miracle. Classical Sculpture From the Dawn of Democracy, the Fifth Century, BC" (1992-1993). In 1992, she co-curated the exhibition "The Odyssey and Ancient Art" at Bard College in New York with Beth Cohen. From 1988, she was an adjunct professor teaching Greek art at Georgetown University in Washington, D.C.

=== Researcher ===
Buitron-Oliver frequently visited the American School of Classical Studies in Athens, Greece, taking her first trip there in 1972 as an NYU doctoral student. Her research focused on Greek vase painting and the archaeology of Cyprus. From 1978 to 1982, she led excavations in the sanctuary of Apollo Hylates in the ancient city of Kourion in Cyprus, focusing on the archaic precinct. This work resulted in her 1996 publication, The Sanctuary of Apollo Hylates at Kourion: Excavations in the Archaic Precinct.

Her husband was Andrew (Drew) Oliver. In 1989, they built a home on Cyprus and returned there whenever possible to pursue research, focusing on the areas of the Black Sea, the Near East, and other Mediterranean sites.

Buitron-Oliver died in Washington, D.C., on 29 April 2002, at the age of 56, after a long illness.

== Selected works ==
- Buitron-Oliver, Diana. Attic vase painting in New England collections. No. 7. Fogg Art Museum, Harvard University, 1972.
- Buitron-Oliver, Diana, ed. New perspectives in early Greek art. National Gallery of Art, 1991.
- Buitron-Oliver, Diana, ed. The Greek miracle: classical sculpture from the dawn of democracy: the fifth century BC. Abrams, 1992.
- Buitron-Oliver, Diana. Douris: a master-painter of athenian red-figure vases. Vol. 9. Philipp von Zabern, 1995.
- Buitron-Oliver, Diana, and Beth Cohen. "Between Skylla and Penelope: Female Characters of the Odyssey." The Distaff Side: Representing the Female in Homer's Odyssey (1995): 29.
- Buitron-Oliver, Diana. The Sanctuary of Apollo Hylates at Kourion: Excavations in the archaic precinct. Vol. 109. Paul Astroms Forlag, 1996.
- Buitron-Oliver, Diana, ed. The interpretation of architectural sculpture in Greece and Rome. National Gallery of Art, 1997.
- Buitron-Oliver, Diana. "Kourion: The evidence for the Kingdom from the 11th to the 6th century BC." Bulletin of the American Schools of Oriental Research 308.1 (1997): 27–36.
- Buitron-Oliver, Diana. Kourion: the elusive Argive settlement and its burial grounds from the 11th to the 8th century BC. Archaeological Research Unit, 1999.
