= Beth Cohen (archaeologist) =

American art historian and archaeologist

Beth Cohen is an American classical archaeologist. She studied under German-American art historian Dietrich von Bothmer at the Institute of Fine Arts of New York University where she received her doctorate on bilingual vase painting of Ancient Greece. Her dissertation, Attic Bilingual Vases and their Painters is the main book used in the study of bilingual vase painting. Cohen became a specialist in the field of Greek vase painting, especially on rare forms of Attic vase painting. She organized the 2006 exhibition The colors of clay. Special techniques in Athenian vases at J. Paul Getty Museum in Malibu.

== Bibliography ==
- Observations on coral-red. in: Marsyas. 15, 1970/71, S. 1–12.
- Attic Bilingual Vases and their Painters. New York 1978. ISBN 0-8240-3220-9.
- Paragone. Sculpture versus painting, Kaineus and the Kleophrades Painter. in: Ancient Greek art and iconography. Madison, Wisc. 1983, S. 171–192.
- Oddities of very early Red-Figure and a new fragment at the Getty. in: Greek vases in the J. Paul Getty Museum. 4. Malibu 1989, S. 73–82.
- The literate potter. A tradition of incised signatures on Attic vases. in: Metropolitan Museum Journal. 26, 1991, S. 49–95.
- Perikles' portrait and the Riace bronzes. New evidence for schinocephaly. in: Hesperia. 60, 1991, S. 465–502.
- with Diana Buitron & N. Austin: The "Odyssey" and ancient art. An epic in word and image. In conjunction with an exhibition of the same name at the Edith C. Blum Art Institute, Bard College, Annandale-on-Hudson, New York. New York 1992. ISBN 0-941276-17-3
- From bowman to clubman. Herakles and Olympia. in: Art Bulletin. 76, 1994, S. 695–715.
- with Diana Buitron-Oliver: Between Skylla and Penelope. Female characters of the „Odyssey“ in archaic and classical Greek art. in: The distaff side. Representing the female in Homer’s „Odyssey“. New York 1995, S. 29–58.
- Divesting the female breast of clothes in classical sculpture. in: Naked truths. Women, sexuality, and gender in classical art and archaeology. London 1997, S. 66–92.
- Man-killers and their victims. Inversions of the heroic ideal in classical art. in: Not the classical ideal. Athens and the construction of the other in Greek art. Leiden 2000, S. 98–131.
- Antico’s bronze busts. Precious metal and the invention of Renaissance antiquities. in: From the parts to the whole. Acta of the 13th International Bronze Congress. Cambridge, Massachusetts, May 28 – June 1, 1996, Bd 2, Portsmouth RI 2002, S. 265–272.
- Bubbles, baubles, bangles and beads. Added clay in Athenian vase painting and its significance. in: Greek vases. Images, contexts and controversies. Proceedings of the conference sponsored by the Center for the Ancient Mediterranean at Columbia University, March 23–24, 2002. Leiden 2004, S. 55–71.
- The colors of clay. Special techniques in Athenian vases. Los Angeles 2006, ISBN 0-89236-571-4.
