= Antiphon Painter =

5th century BC Athenian vase painter

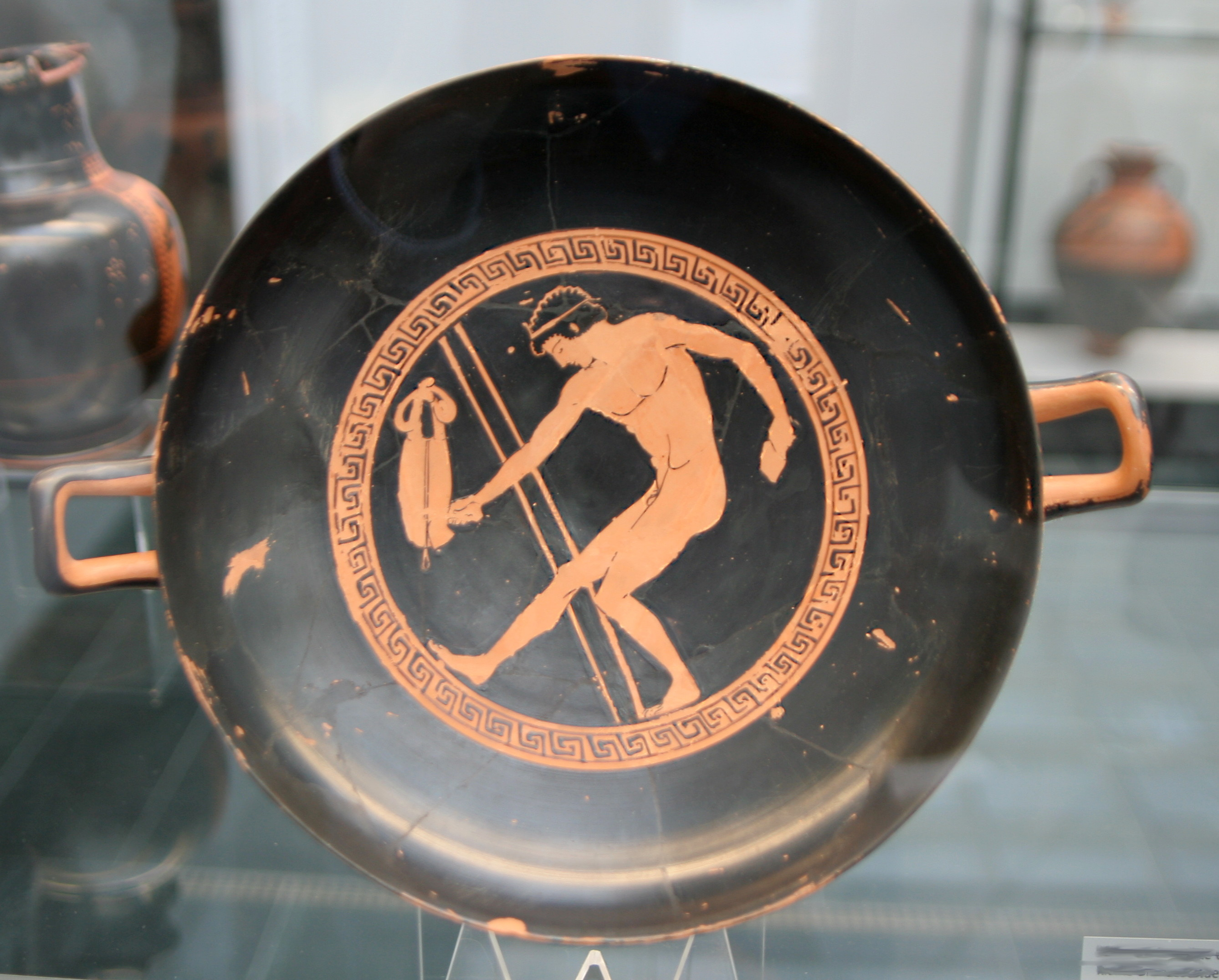
Young athlete, red-figure kylix by the Antiphon Painter, c. 490 BC, Staatliche Antikensammlungen (Inv. 2635)

The Antiphon Painter (fl. 495–480 BC) is the Notname for an Athenian red-figure vase-painter active in ancient Greece during the early 5th century BC. He owes his name to a double Kalos inscription of Antiphon on the dinos stand in the Antique collection of Berlin (Inventory number F 2325). He learned his handicraft in the workshop of Euphronios and Onesimos. There he worked closely with them, the Kalmarer Painter and other painters.

There are about 100 drinking containers of his (primarily kylikes) known to us. They almost exclusively depict the life of the aristocratic youth of Athens. They are shown as athletes, in symposia, in komos scenes, and with their horses or in arms. Representations of women – in particular Hetairai – are rare, as are mythological topics. When he depicts mythological subjects, they are usually the heroic acts of Herakles or Theseus. One of his bowls possibly refers to the Battle of Marathon (Orvieto, Collection Faina).

A special speciality of the painter were his red-figure Eye-cups. The Antiphon Painter was the last artist to create these.
