= Psykter =

Type of Greek vase used as a wine cooler

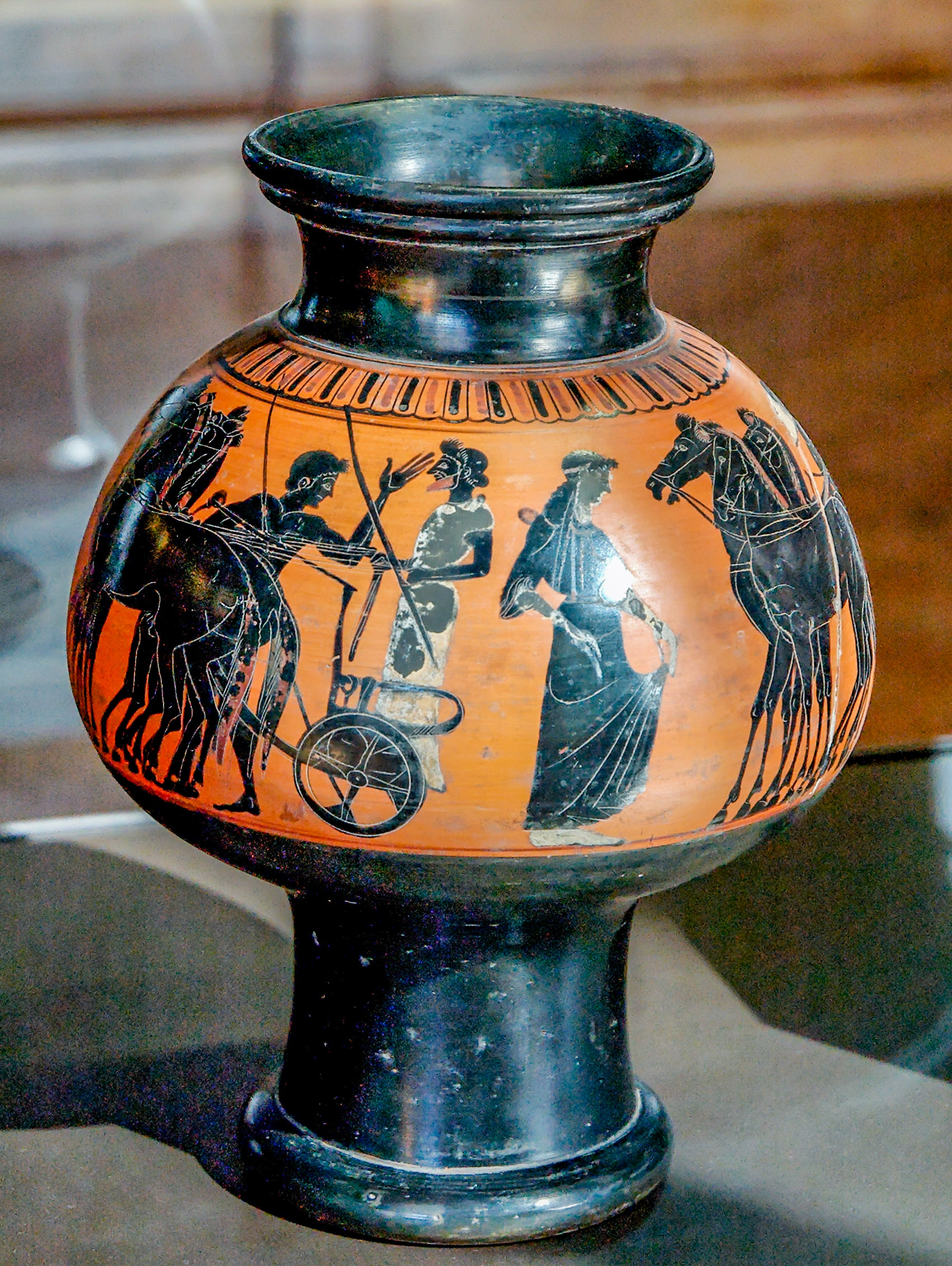
Example of a psykter (Louvre)

A psykter (Ancient Greek: ψυκτήρ, 'cooler') is a type of Greek vase that is characterized by a bulbous body set on a high, narrow foot. It was used as a wine cooler, and specifically as part of the elite sympotic set in the ancient Greek symposium. The psykter, as distinct from other coolers, is a vase which has a mushroom-shaped body, and was produced for only a short period of time during the late-sixth to mid-fifth centuries, with almost all of this type dating to between 520 and 480 BCE.

The fact of its brevity combined with there being a number of simpler methods of cooling wine suggests that this shape was merely a fad. It is possible that it came about as a response to avoiding mixing contaminated snow-ice directly in wine, as it was known that this could cause illness, but this is unlikely as the alcohol in wine has useful sterilizing properties. Even proportionately to other wine utensils of its time it is comparatively rare, with few examples being found. Although the psykter did have its specific function, nevertheless, it was almost certainly something of a whimsical device, an objet du jour, which will have given the symposion's guests some aesthetic titillation and the host kudos for good taste. Because the process of cooling wine could be achieved in a number of other ways, none of which required the psykter, its redundancy appears to have quickly made it obsolete.

Typically, wine was cooled by the addition of chilled water or snow-ice to wine in a krater, and that method pre-dated and outlasted the psykter. Less certain is precisely how it was used. It appears that it was designed to float in the krater, and to either contain wine which became chilled as it floated in the ice-cooled water, or instead the psykter was filled with ice which chilled the wine in which it floated. With regard to what effect each of these options would have on the wine's temperature it is possible to arrive at the following conclusions. If the wine was to be chilled as is common today, to about 12 °C (54 °F), then we would expect to see the wine in the krater and the coolant in the psykter. This is because the wine would have ice on one side (the inside) and room temperature on the other side (the outside of the krater). This would maintain the temperature of the wine part way between room temperature and 0 °C (32 °F), though, it would be closer to room temperature than to 0 °C because the outer surface area of the wine is greater than the inner surface area. However, if the wine was to be cooled to near 0 °C, then the only possible option is to put the ice in the krater and the wine in the psykter, as in this case the wine is almost fully enclosed by ice. Whilst neither one is conclusive, the first option is appealing because it does not alter the ancient Greek tradition of wine being mixed in the krater.

Whilst the ancient sources do write of people drinking wine directly from a psykter, it is not clear whether they refer to the mushroom-shaped psykter specifically. Additionally, it would be considerably less costly to fill the psykter with ice rather than the krater. If the coolant were to be pre-chilled water then either way would be economical, although the cooling effect of chilled water, as opposed to ice, in the psykter would be minimal.
