= Myson (Greek artist) =

Ancient Greek Vase Painter

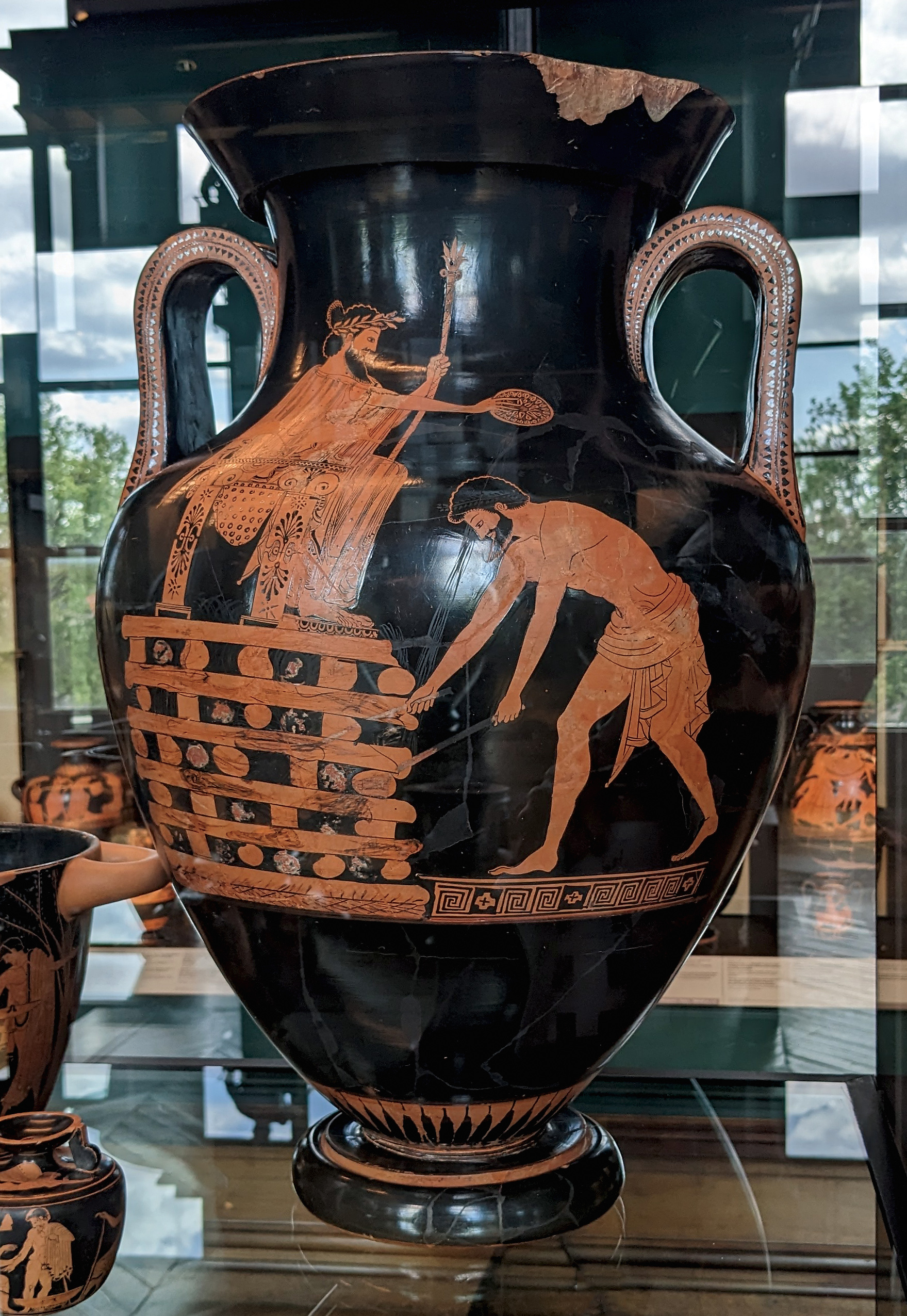
- Type A amphora showing Croesus at the pyre, from 500-490 BC, by Myson. The B side depicts the abduction of Antiope. Located in the Louvre, G197.
- Style: Red-figure
- Movement: Teacher of the Mannerists

Myson (Ancient Greek: Μυσον) was an ancient Greek red figure vase painter and potter active in Athens during the first half of the 5th Century BC. His speciality was column kraters. He has been identified as a precursor to the Mannerist group of Greek vase painters and his workshop, founded around 500 BC, employed the early mannerists. Myson may have learned his craft in the workshop of one of the Pioneer Group, perhaps Phintias. Before 500 BC, he may have worked on cups, with one naming Leagros. He is also considered a tutor of the Pan Painter, as well as the Seesaw Painter. A single egraphsen signature from a vase on the Acropolis was used to identify Myson, and Beazley subsequently assigned 30 vases to Myson's hand through style Hoppin observed that a break on the Acropolis fragment before the 'M' suggests that Myson may not be his complete name.

== Style ==
Most of Myson's scenes are of athletes and Dionysiac revelry, and his style is usually considered to be conservative. His figures of athletes typically have small heads, are tight-lipped and slim sharp noses. A calyx krater with Apollo represents some possible uncertainty about anatomy. Beazley characterises Myson's method as a 'sound archaic style' and as similar in style to the Eucharides Painter. Creative decisions chosen by Myson reflect similar choices by the Nikoxenos Painter, who taught the Eucharides Painter. For instance, the decision to use a lotus-bud, dot-net, and reserved line as borders for a panel was used in pelikai by both.

== Works ==
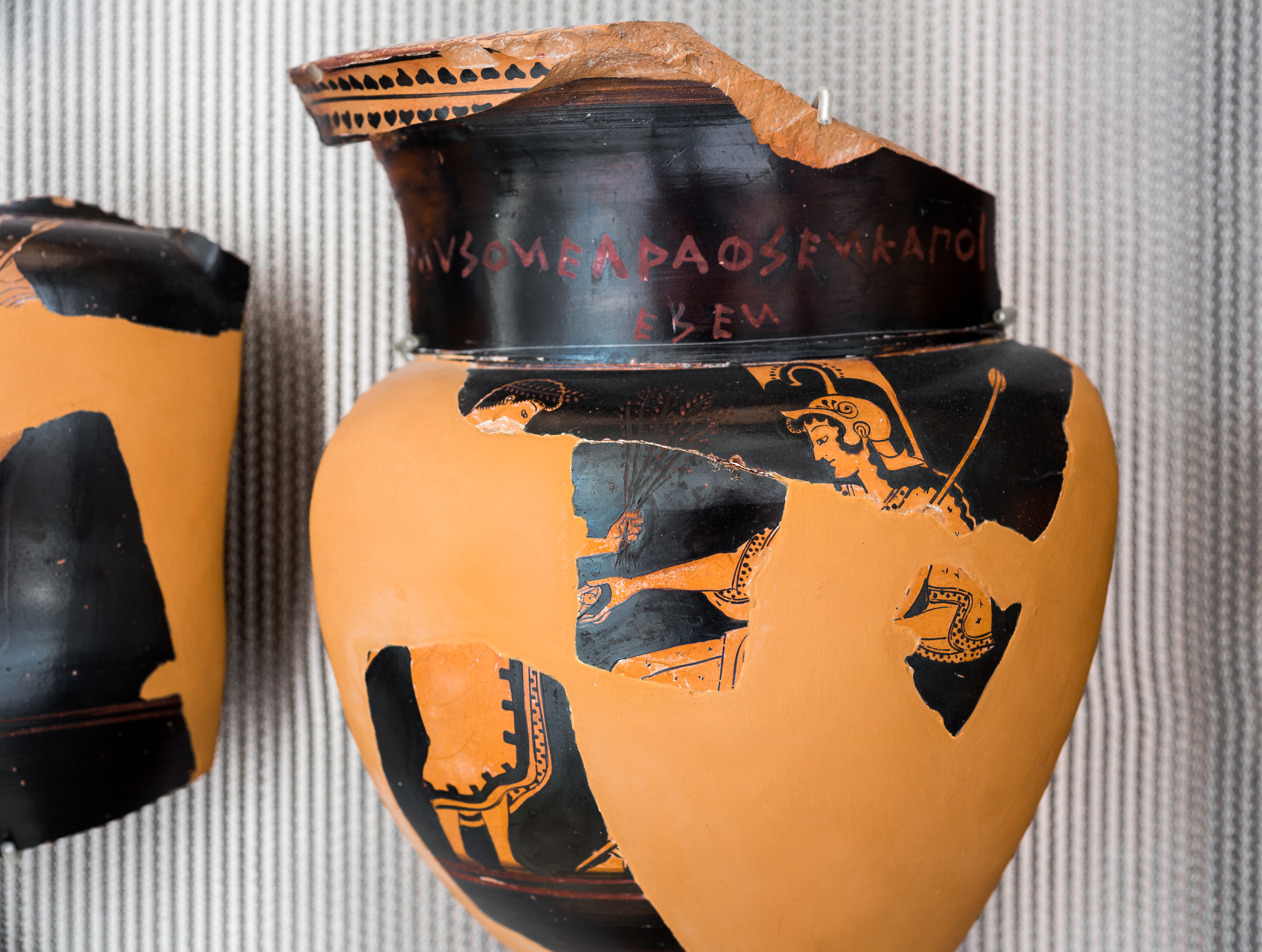
Fragment of a column krater by Myson. The neck of side B bears the inscription MYSON EGRAPHSEN KA(i e)POIESEN (as a votive gift to Athena). ca. 490 BC. Athens Akropolis Museum, 806.

Amphora, Louvre, G197. The 'Croesus on the Pyre' vase. Widely considered his best work. The frameless design for this vase echoes a similar decision sometimes taken by the Berlin Painter, which might show a particular importance for this work.

Calyx krater, British Museum, 1842,0822.1. Likely purchased from Flavien de Magnoncourt (1800-1875).

Calyx krater, Munich Staatliche Antikensammlung, 3257.

Column krater, University of Pennsylvania, MS5688. Gift of Nina C. Lea from 1921.

Column krater, Acropolis Museum, 806. Found in 1886 east of the Parthenon in fragments, pieced together and partially restored.

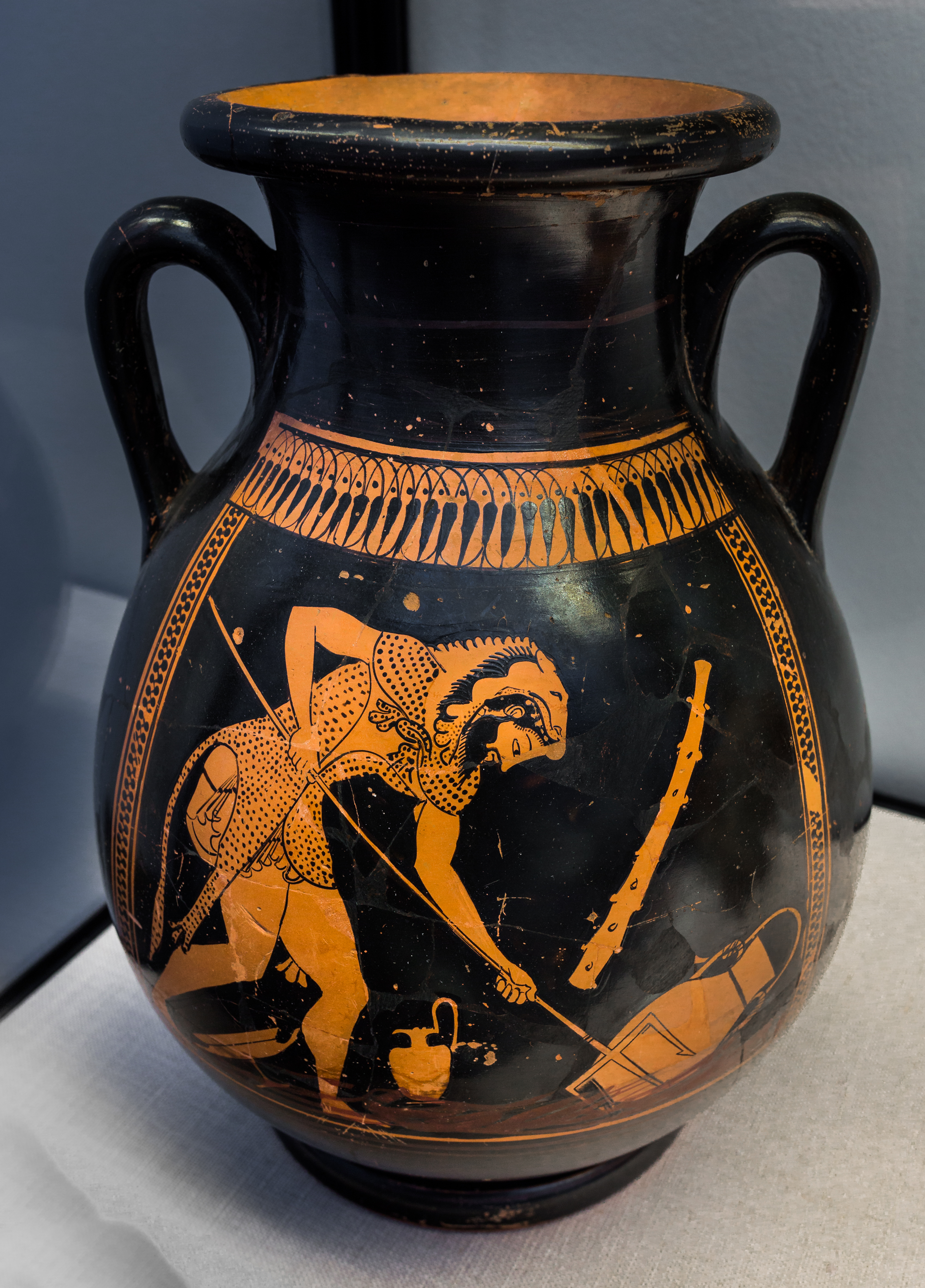
Pelike of Herakles destroying the household of Nereus on side A. Side B shows Nereus´ female servant armed with a pestle. ca. 490 BC. Munich, Staatliche Antikensammlungen 8762.

Terracotta column krater, Metropolitan Museum, 56.171.45.

== Influence ==
Sourvinou-Inwood argues that the Pan Painter was likely a 'shop-boy' working in Myson's workshop, although he was an apprentice under the Berlin Painter.

Beazley believed other early Mannerists, including the Agrigento Painter, the Pig Painter, the Painter of London 95 and the Perseus Painter were all influenced by Myson. He identifies the Diogenes Painter as being influenced by Myson, but as 'outstripping' his work.
