= Nausicaa Painter =

Ancient Greek vase painter

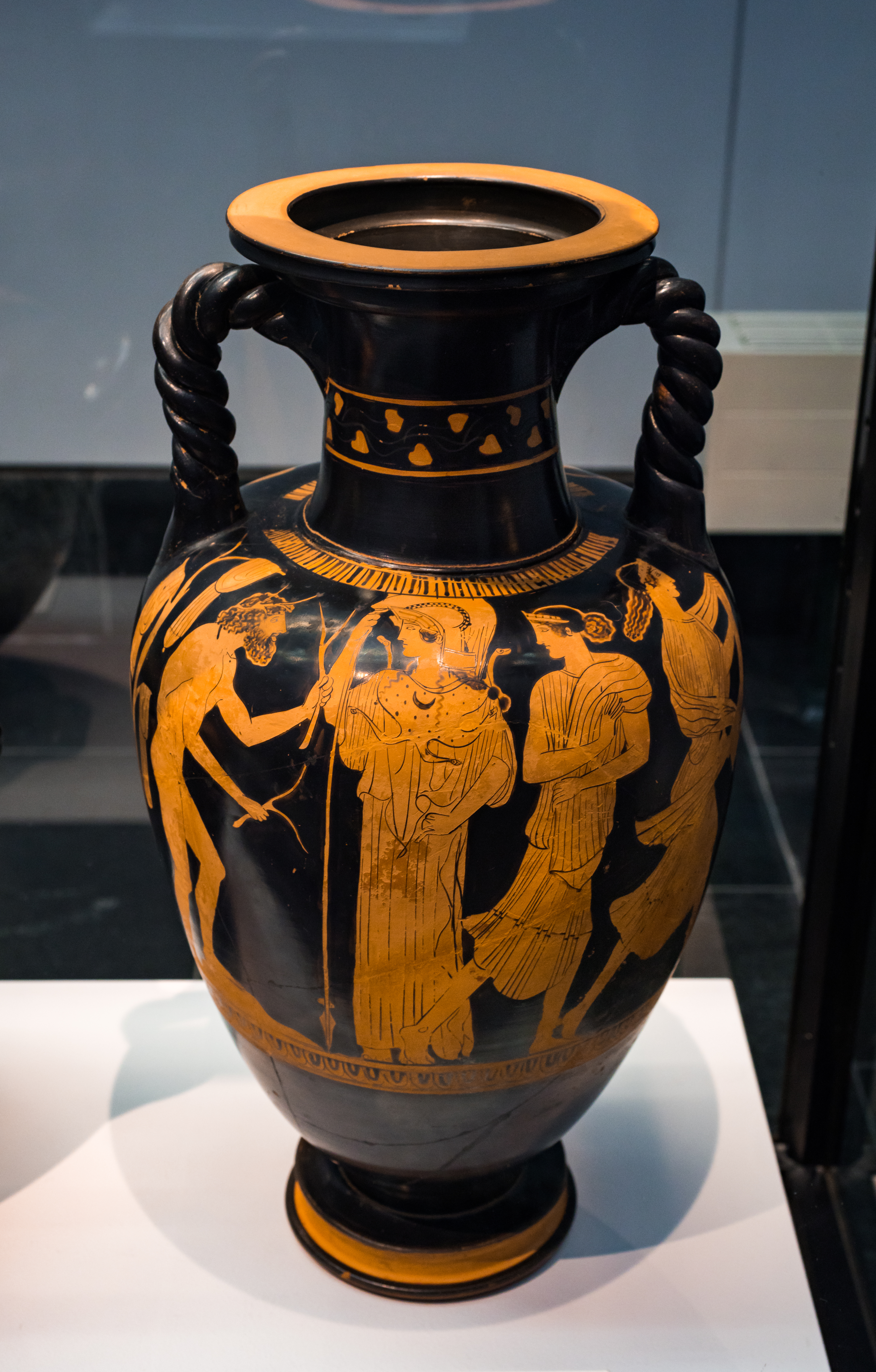
- Neck amphora by the Nausicaa Painter from 475–425 BC. Side A depicts Odysseus with sprigs and Athena, next to Nausicaa. Side B depicts women with clothes around a rock. Located in Munich, 2322.
- Style: Red-figure
- Movement: Later Mannerists, NH Group

The Nausicaa Painter (also spelled Nausikaa Painter) was an ancient Greek red figure vase painter active in Athens during the second half of the 5th century BC. He belonged to the Later Mannerist school of vase-painters. Art historian John Beazley categorised the vase painter within the "NH Group", a group of seven early painters in the Later Mannerist school, named after the Nausicaa and Hephaistos Painters. The painter's name vase is a neck amphora in the Munich Antikensammlung showing Odysseus and Nausicaa. One of his vases is signed "Polygnotus", being one of three Athenian vase painters with this name.

The shape of his neck amphorae, with distinctive twisted handles, echo those of the Niobid Painter. This influence is confirmed in an oinochoe from the Berlin Antikensammlung, F 2408, which copies the ornaments on jugs by the Niobid Painter.

== Style ==
Figures depicted by the Nausicaa Painter typically have elongated fingers, heavy lips, with a nose and brow formed by a singular, elongated line. The feet of figures by the Nausicaa Painter are usually large and triangular, with tear-shaped ankles, thin and flat toes. The Nausicaa Painter's vases often have a frontal figure in between two other figures in profile, and depict males shown in three-quarter view from behind.

== Work ==
- Neck amphora with Odysseus and Nausicaa, Munich, 2322. In contrast to the scene as described in the Odyssey, the women do not notice the arrival of Odysseus. Originally from Vulci.
- Neck amphora with Iaolis, Herakles and Athena on Side A, and an older king on side B. Formerly in a private collection, Castle Ashby, Northampton, 52, presently in the Zimmermann collection. Originally from Etruria.
- Type B amphora, British Museum, 1846,0128.1. Two women participate in a bull sacrifice on side A, while adorning the bulls with stemmata (sacrificial fillets). Side B depicts a libation scene, one figure possibly representing Dionysus. Signed with ΠΟΛΥΓΝΟΤΥΣ ΕΓΡΑΠΣΕΝ. Thomas Mannack described this vase as belonging to the painter's "Classical Phase", along with a pelike in the New York Metropolitan Museum (inv. 06.1021.144). The amphora was purchased by the British Museum from the art collector Thomas Emmerson.
- Column krater in the Louvre, G 353. Side A depicts a Komos, two youths, one with a staff and pipescase, one with lyre, woman playing pipes. Side B depicts three draped youths.
- Column krater in the Bologna Museo Civico Archeologico, P 186. Side A depicts a man with a sceptre pursuing a woman fleeing to an altar. Side B depicts a man between women.
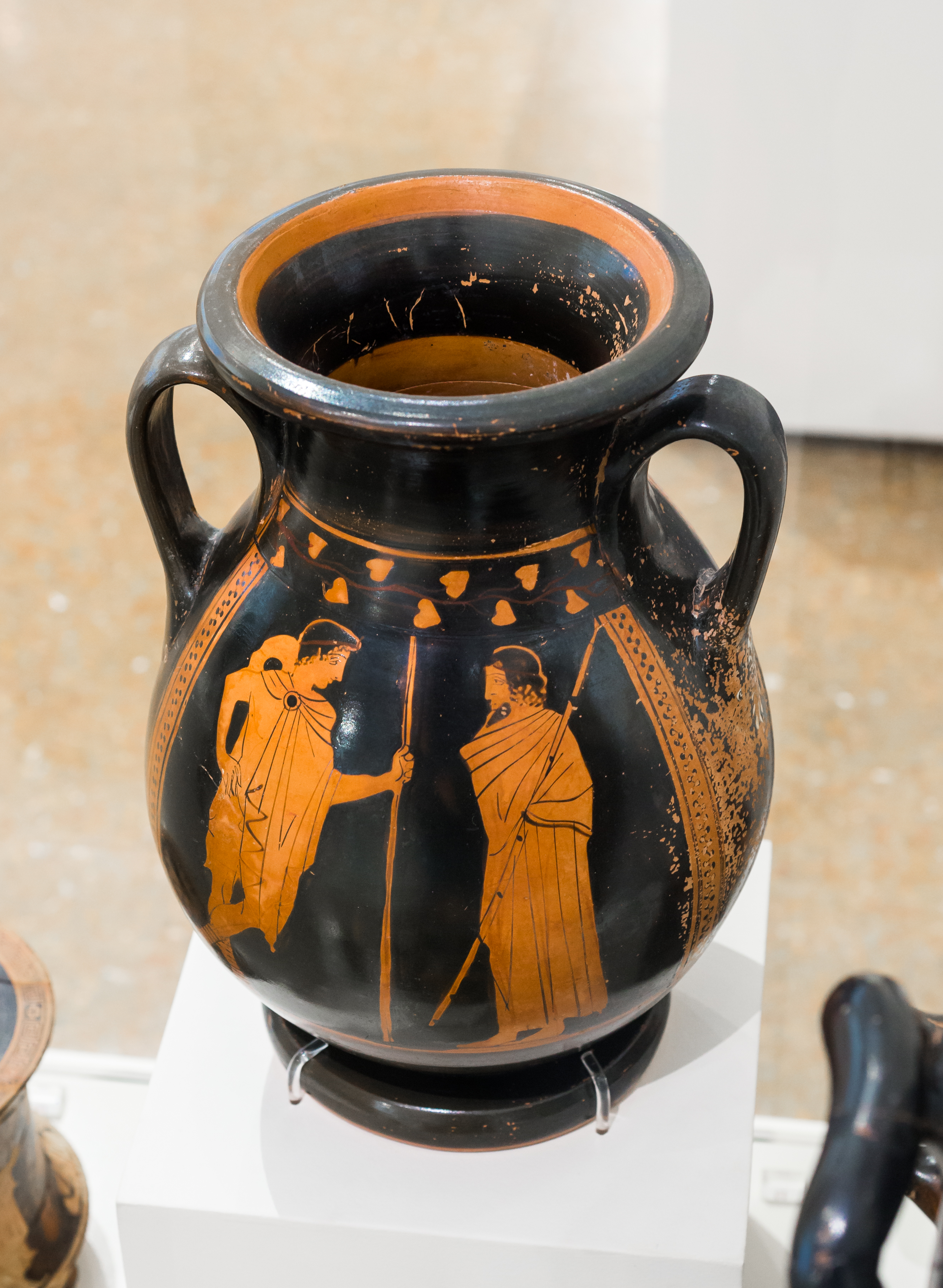
  Pelike showing two young males leaning against a pillar. Located in the National Archaeological Museum, Athens, 1400.

== Influence ==
The Nausicaa Painter is linked to the Leningrad Painter, who painted on column-kraters of a similar shape. The Nausicaa Painter also drew inspiration from the Agrigento Painter. A satyr on a pelike in the National Archaeological Museum Athens, 1687, copies figures drawn by the Agrigento Painter.

The Painter of Tarquinia 707 was a follower of the Nausicaa Painter.

The Orestes Painter was clearly influenced by the Nausicaa Painter. Similar to the Nausicaa Painter, the Orestes Painter preferred plain borders or borders with a battlement pattern. The folds in the drapery of a woman playing a lyre on a column-krater by the Orestes Painter matches the style of the Nausicaa Painter. This is also noticeable on the figure of Nike on a column krater now in Syracuse, in the Museo Nazionale, 6262.
