= Nikoxenos Painter =

Ancient Greek vase painter

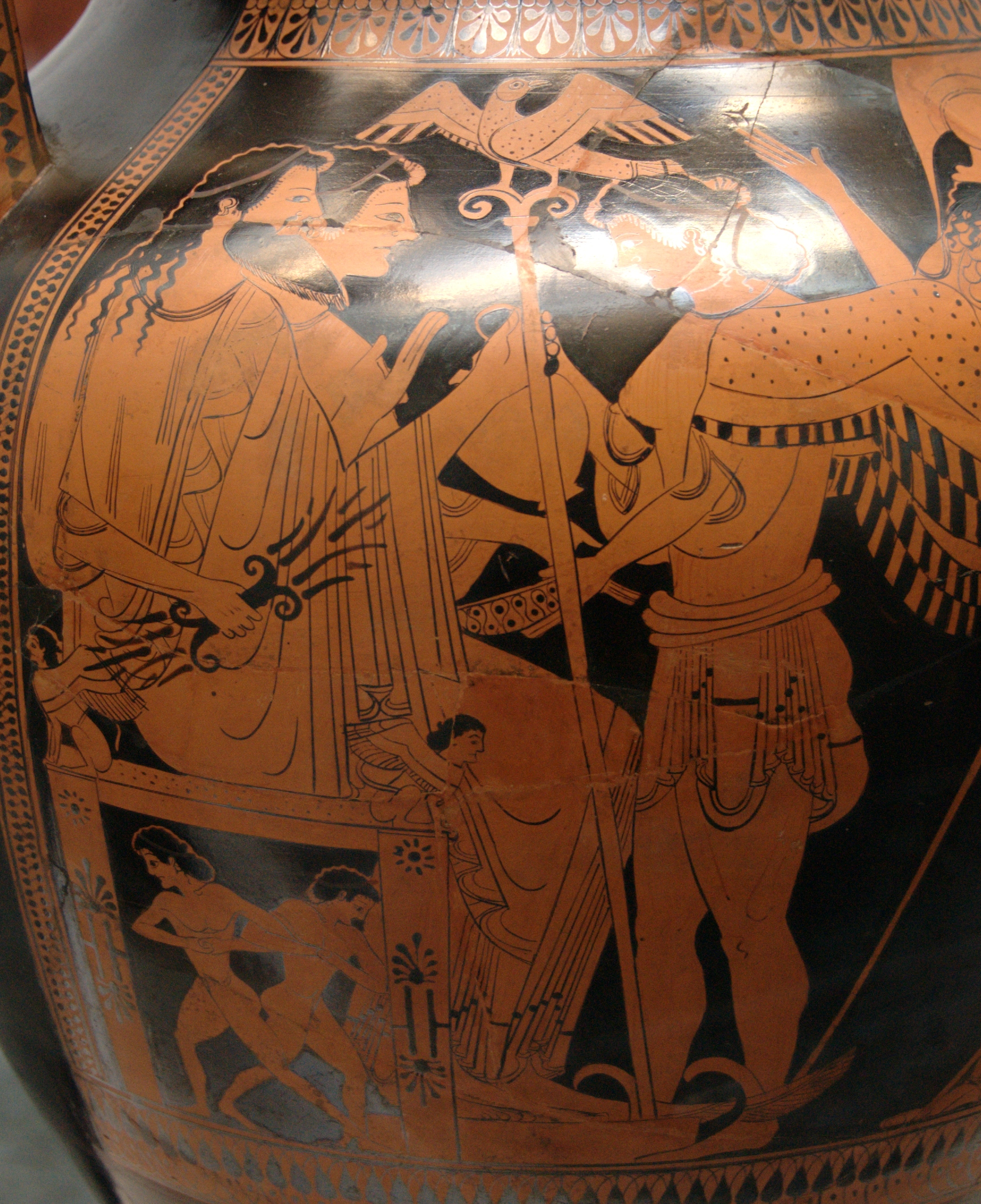
Assembly of the Gods on Mount Olympus: Zeus and Hera enthroned, the servant of the Gods, Iris, attending to them; Front of a belly amphora circa 500 BC; Munich: Staatliche Antikensammlungen.

The Nikoxenos Painter (Ancient Greek: Νικόξενος) was an Attic vase painter who worked in both the black-figure and red-figure styles. He was active in the end of the sixth and the beginning of the fifth centuries BC. His real name is not known.

He was one of the few painters to work, apparently by his own choice, in both major styles. He painted black-figure amphorae and pelikai resembling the work of the Leagros Group. His hydria and kalpidai with continuous profile were already in the tradition of the new style. His black-figure work is considered better than his red-figure. The Eucharides Painter was his pupil; according to some theories they were actually identical.

== Bibliography ==
- John Beazley: Attic Black-figure Vase-painters. Oxford 1956, p.
- John Boardman: Schwarzfigurige Vasen aus Athen. Ein Handbuch, von Zabern, 4. Edn., Mainz 1994 (Kulturgeschichte der Antiken Welt, Vol 1) ISBN 3-8053-0233-9, p. 124f.
