= Mannerists (Greek vase painting) =

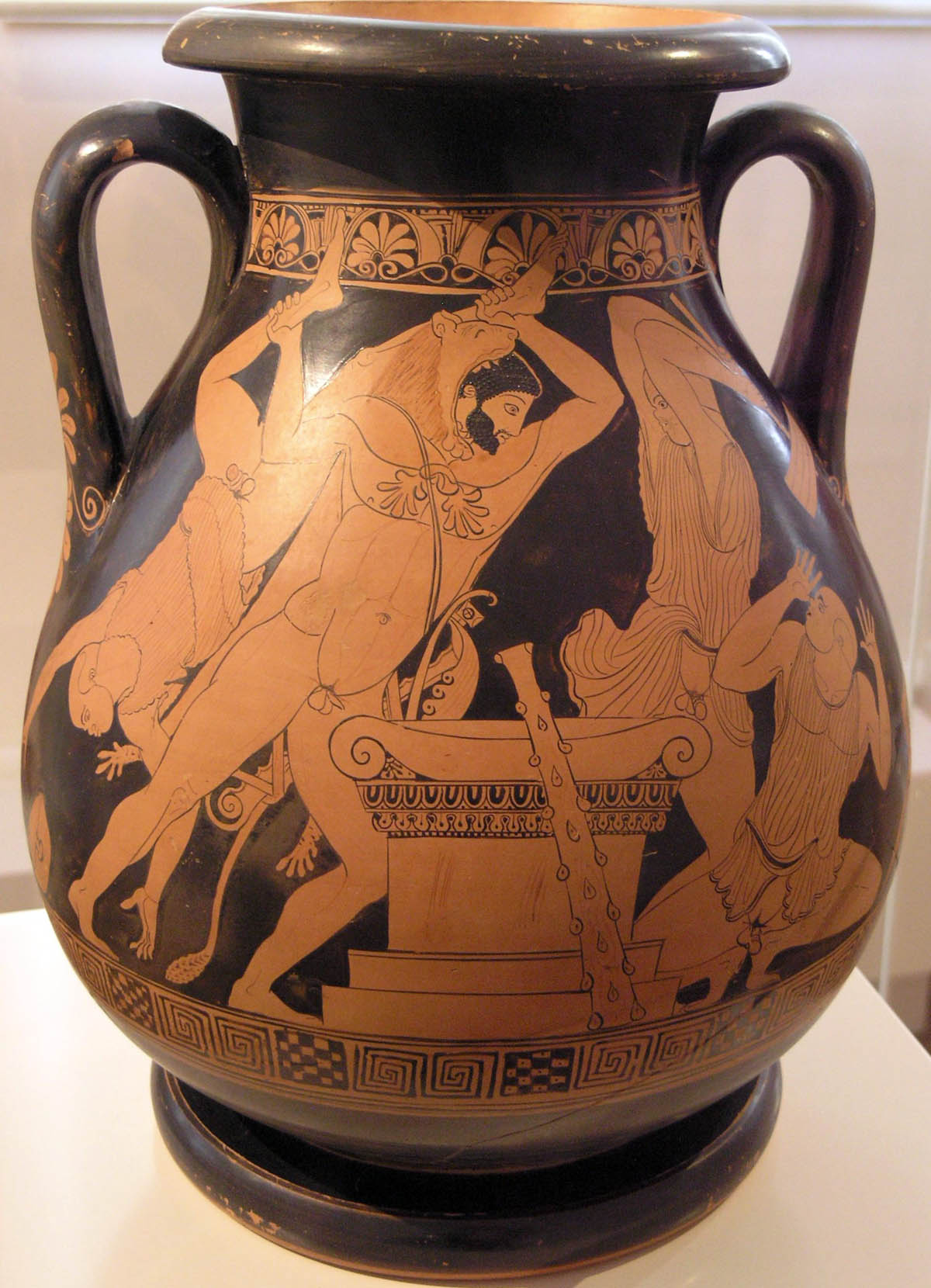
Herakles fights Busiris, pelike by the Pan Painter, circa 470 BC. Athens, National Museum.

In archaeological scholarship, the term Mannerists describes a large group of Attic red-figure vase painters, stylistically linked by their affected painting style.

The group comprised more than 15 artists. They preferred to paint column kraters, hydriai and pelikes. They were active from about 480 BC until near the end of the 5th century BC. In their artwork, the figures seem elongated and have small heads, the garment folds are falling stiff, resembling stairs, and the images are framed with red-figure style ornamentations, such as detailed furniture and drapery. The range of motifs is also influenced by previous periods. Thus, Achilles and Ajax playing a boardgame, a popular black-figure motif introduced by Exekias, are depicted often. The figures gesticulate as if using a form of sign language, especially the hands often appear stiff and theatrical. Komos and symposion scenes are especially popular. Influenced by other contemporary painters, the second generation of mannerists favoured domestic scenes. Occasionally, they also depicted rare motifs, such as the madness of Salmoneus, of which they produced the only known painting.

The earliest representatives of the style worked in the workshop of the potter Myson between 480 and 450 BC. The most important artist of the style at that time was the Pan Painter. Also significant were the Pig Painter, the Leningrad Painter and the Agrigento Painter. The middle phase, between about 450 and 425 BC, is dominated by the Nausikaa-Hephaistos Group, comprising seven artists. Its leading and eponymous artists were the Nausikaa Painter and the Hephaistos Painter. The last important artists of the style, near the end of the 5th century, are the Academy Painter and the Painter of Athens 1183.

== Bibliography ==
- John H. Oakley: Manieristen, in Der Neue Pauly Vol. 7 (1999), Col. 816
