= Pan Painter =

Ancient Greek vase painter

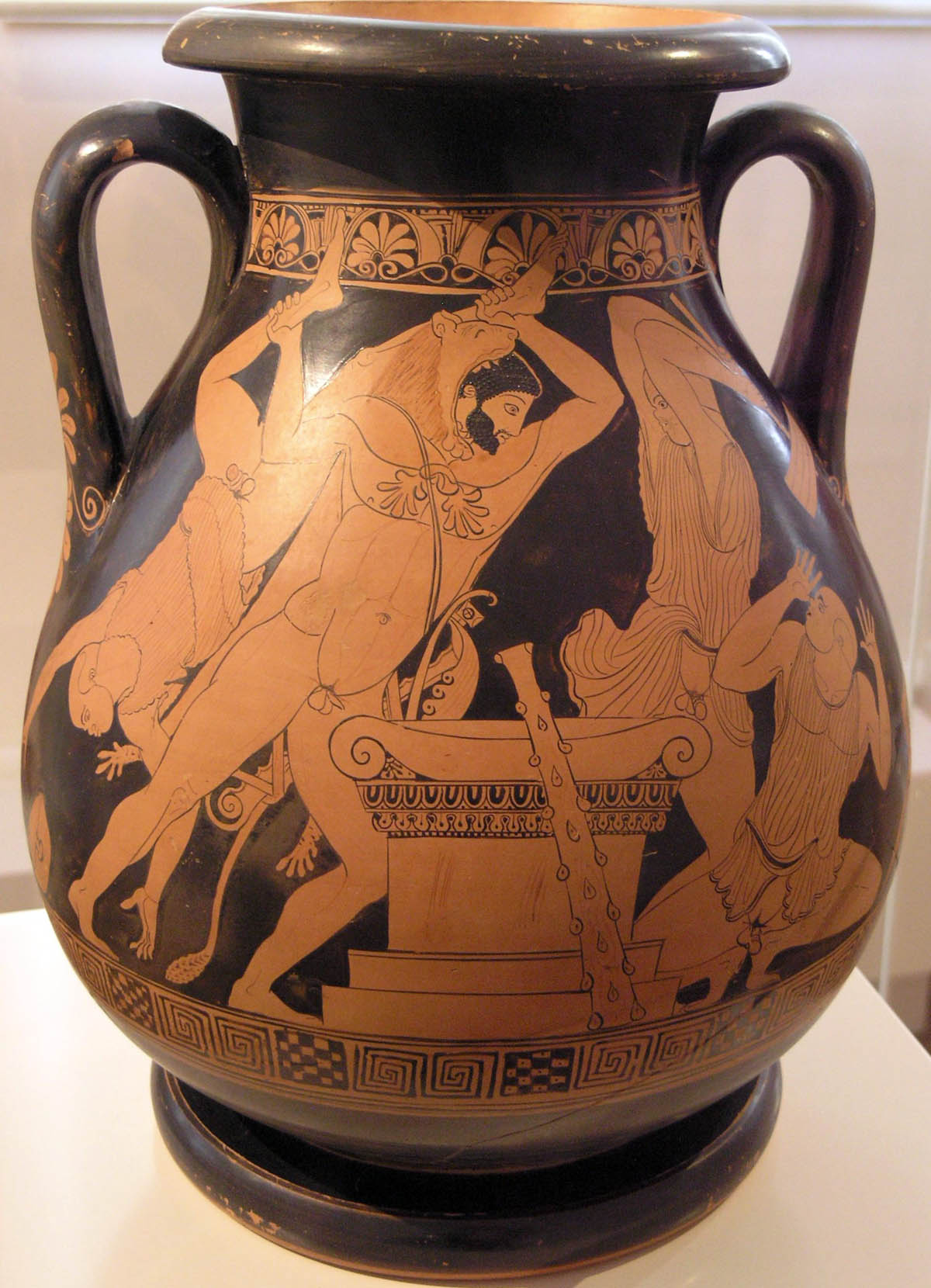
Pelike showing Heracles fighting Busiris, found at Thespiai. Circa 470 BC. Athens, National Archaeological Museum.

The Pan Painter was an ancient Greek vase-painter of the Attic red-figure style, probably active c. 480 to 450 BC. John Beazley attributed over 150 vases to his hand in 1912:

Cunning composition; rapid motion; quick deft draughtsmanship; strong and peculiar stylisation; a deliberate archaism, retaining old forms, but refining, refreshing, and galvanizing them; nothing noble or majestic, but grace, humour, vivacity, originality, and dramatic force: these are the qualities which mark the Boston krater, and which characterize the anonymous artist who, for the sake of convenience, may be called the 'master of the Boston Pan-vase', or, more briefly, 'the Pan-master'.

== Archaic Mannerism ==
Beazley identified the Pan Painter as a pupil of Myson, teacher of the Mannerists (beginning around the 470s BC), a term applied (often pejoratively) to a group who used "mannered" depiction of figures for decorative effect. Mannerists also magnified the gestures, made most forms skinnier and at the same time shrunk the heads of the figures. More attention was given to the pattern that clothing offered than the naturalization of the human form. Most often, either black buds or black ivy create frames around the scenes. Most of the pottery that has been attributed to Mannerists are pelikai, hydriai, and kraters. Though the original names of the artists are unknown, historians have given artists names based on pieces that seem to be painted by the same person or group of artists; some Archaic Mannerist artists are: the Pig Painter, Agrigento Painter, Oinanthe Painter, Perseus Painter, Leningrad Painter, and Pan Painter.

== Pan Painter style ==
While the Mannerists are marked starting in the 470s BC, some of the Pan Painter's vases have been dated around the 480s BC. The Pan Painter's heads have the illusion of being smaller than they are next to the largely painted necks, small eyes and small noses. The chins, however, are strong and rounded. The Pan Painter's restrained use of ornament and his coherent continuous compositions, however, set him apart from the Mannnerists. His assured outlines and deft handling of space and volume are "characteristic of the best of the Archaic period". The Pan Painter depicted scenes from day-to-day life as well as Greek mythology, which were common subjects in red-figure painting. His style used techniques from archaic painting, but he brought new aspects to the paintings.

== Attributed vases ==
=== Pan Painter's name-vase ===
His name-vase is a bell krater (in Boston Museum of Fine Arts's collection) depicting Pan pursuing a goatherd on one side and Artemis killing Aktaion on the reverse side. The folds in the clothing separate the Pan Painter from other Archaic depictions of cloth. The Pan Painter creates space by foreshortening Artemis' foot and Aktaion's legs.

A column krater depicting Dionysus has a careful illustration of a satyr carrying a full cup. The Pan Painter painted the hands near the bottom of the cup giving weight to the satyr's task (in the MET).

The oinochoe that depicts Ganymede running from Zeus while holding a rooster, a hoop and a stick contains the common theme of one character running away from another (in the MET).

The Attic lekythos depicting Nike is an excellent example of the Pan Painter's attention to detail. The Pan Painter gives care to lines creating the clothing and the indent from one feather to the next on the edge of Nike's wings (in New Jersey).

A pelike depicts a youth carrying furniture, likely getting ready for a symposium or during a one. On the other side is an older man holding rods in his hand, possibly ready to discipline the boy if he dropped the furniture.

=== Other works ===
- Bell krater in Boston (Pan and shepherd, death of Aktaion)
- Pelike in Athens (Heracles and Busiris)
- Psykter in America (Apollos fighting for Marpessa)
- Lekythos in Boston (depiction of a hunter)
- Oinochoe in London (Boreas pursuing Oreithyia while her father grieves)
- Hydria in London (Perseus, Medusa and Athena)
- Volute krater (with Artemis and Aktaion on one side and Dionysus and giant on other)
- Pyskter (Apollo fights Idas for Marpessa)
- Column krater (Sacrifice at a herm)
- Oinochoe (with Ganymede and possibly Zeus)
- Nolan amphora (with Zeus and Ganymede)
- Column krater (with nude female carrying erect male genitalia)
- Bell krater (with Dionysos)
- Pelike (with a fisherman)
- Nolan amphora (with Nereid)
- Dinos (possibly a symposium scene)
- Lekythos (with Nike)
- Lekythos (with Artemis on a white ground)
- Pelike (with Perseus and gorgoneion)
- Pelike (with furniture-carrier)

== Artists influenced by the Pan Painter ==
The Agrigento Painter was another Mannerist who painted a scene of Herakles and Busiris. Herakles is shown in the middle of beating another man. (in the MET)

The Alkimachos Painter may have been inspired by the Pan Painter because of the resemblances seen in the Greek and Amazon Nolan amphora. (in the MET)

== Bibliography ==
- John Beazley, Attic Red-figure Vase-painters. 2nd ed., Oxford 1967.
- John Beazley. Der Pan-Maler. Berlin 1941.
- Anna Follmann. Der Pan-Maler. Bonn 1958.
- Pan-Maler. in: Lexikon Alte Kulturen. Vol 3, p. 101.
- Pan-Maler. in: Lexikon der Kunst. Vol 3, p. 716.
- Susan Woodford, An Introduction To Greek Art, London, 1987
- Amy Smith, Master of Attic Red-Figure Painting: The art and Legacy of the Pan painter, London, 2018
