= Acheloos Painter =

Unidentified ancient Greek vase painter

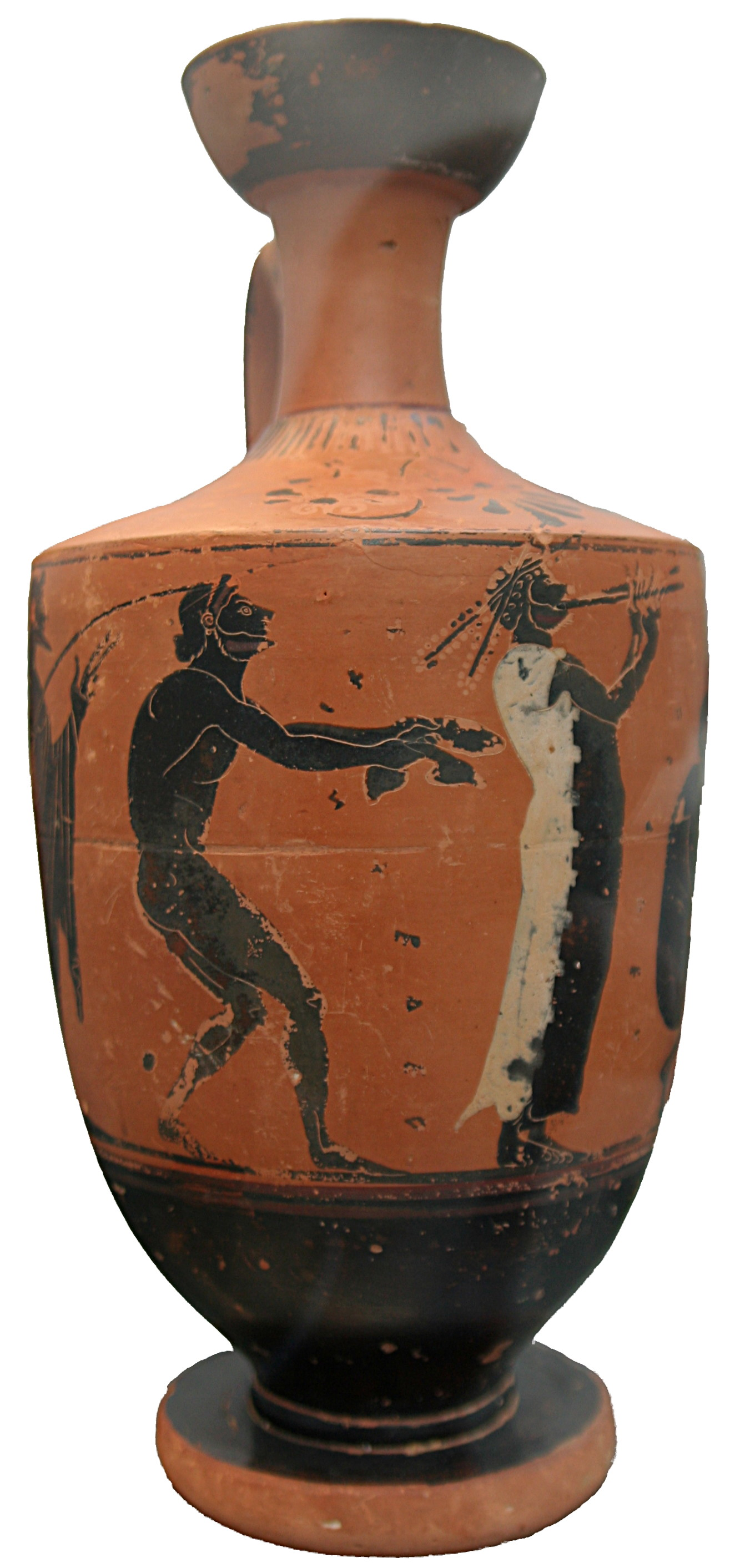
- Athlete bringing jumping weights into play; that is, actually jumping, and an aulos player, theme on a black-figure lekythos by the Acheloos Painter. The vase is located in the Staatliche Antikensammlungen, Inventory Number 1892, Berlin.
- Born: Unknown. The name vase is a black-figure amphora depicting Herakles fighting the river god, Acheloos. Before 525 BCE
- Died: About 500 BCE
- Known for: Vase painting
- Notable work: Worked at Athens
- Movement: Black-figure style, Leagros Group.

The Acheloos Painter, active around 525–500 BCE in Athens, was a vase painter of the black-figure style. This painter's scenes were like those of the Leagros Group; however, unlike the Group's work, the Acheloos Painter's themes are comic episodes, similar to modern cartoons. Herakles was a favorite topic, as were banqueting scenes. The banqueters were portrayed satirically: overweight, aging, bearing huge, jutting noses, and so on. The heroic is made anti-heroic by parody. The artist's preferred vase forms are amphorae and hydriae.

== Name vase ==
The name vase of the Acheloos Painter depicts a fight between the river god Acheloos, and Heracles. The vase was formerly Amphora F 1851 in the Berlin Antique collection, and is now missing. In this comic depiction, the screaming and frightened river god, in the form of a horned centaur, is kept from escaping by an unflustered Herakles pulling him back by the horns. Hermes, stock messenger of the gods, sits at ease. His long, projecting beard juts out parallel to his long, projecting nose. In the heroic scenes of Greek mythology, a hero ought to be victorious over awful and implacable monsters according to the will of the divine gods. In this scene and others like it, the hero demeans himself with a craven and ridiculous monster while the caricature of divinity slumps over in a state of ennui. "Nonsense inscriptions" have nothing to say.

In an unrelated scene on the opposite side, a hoplite and an archer say goodbye to their aged parents. The wrinkles are shown in the mother's neck. The hoplite's shield covers him up to his nose. On it is emblazoned an isolated running leg with a naked buttock. A dog sniffs at the hoplite's groin region.

== Selected works ==
Name	Images	Dimensions	Type	Date	Description	Museum Record
Altenburg, Staatliches Lindenau-Museum
Amphora 228						
Basel, Antikenmuseum und Sammlung Ludwig
Amphora BS 1906.294						
Berlin, Antikensammlung
Amphora F 1845						
Amphora F 1851						
Hydria F 1905						
Cambridge, Harvard University Art Museums
Amphora 1960.314		H. 40.9 cm, W. 27.9 cm	Attic Black-figure neck amphora	510-500 BC	A: Departure scene	Record
Florence, Museo archeologico di Firenze
Amphora 3871			Attic black-figure amphora	510-500 BC	A: Heracles and the cercopi; B: Heracles and Apollo	
London, The British Museum
Panathenaic Amphora B 167						
Mississippi, University of Mississippi
Amphora 1977.3.71		H. 36 cm, D. 24.5 cm	Attic black-figure amphora	510-500 BC	Departure scene	record
Munich, Staatliche Antikensammlung
Amphora SL 459						
Lekythos 1892		----	Attic black-figure lekythos	525-500 BC	Athlete holding jumping weights and aulos player	
New York, Metropolitan Museum of Art
Pelike 49.11.1		H. 33.3 cm	Attic black figure pelike	c.510 BC	A: King Midas's men discover Silenos; B: Flute-player and boxers	Record
Reading, The Ure Museum of Greek Archaeology
Amphora 45.10.22						
Toledo, Toledo Museum of Art
Amphora 58.69						
Würzburg, Martin von Wagner Museum
Amphora 210						

== See also ==
- List of Greek vase painters
