= Chiusi Painter =

Ancient Greek vase painter

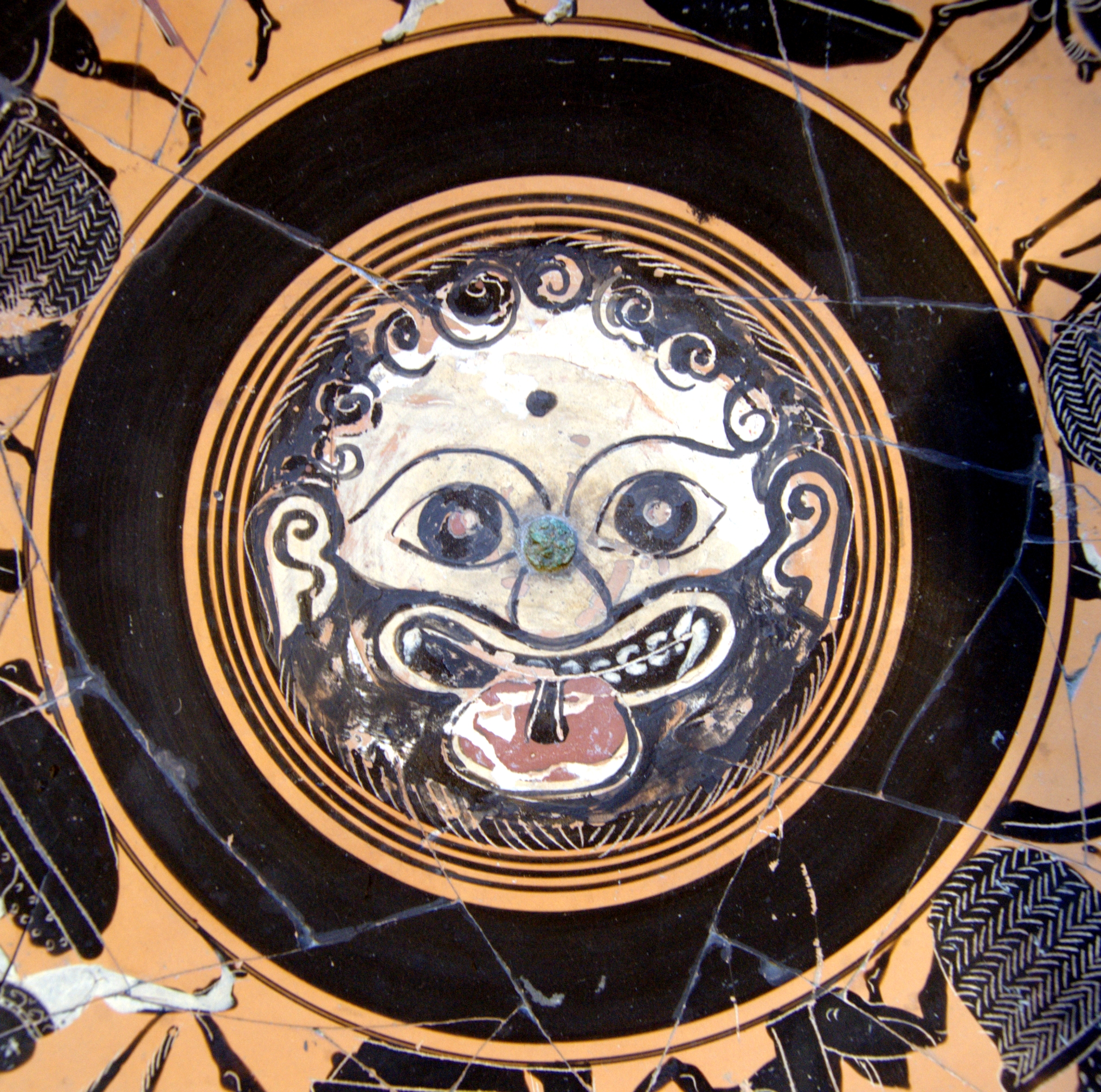
Tondo of a kylix with the depiction of a gorgon. Paris: Cabinet des médailles.

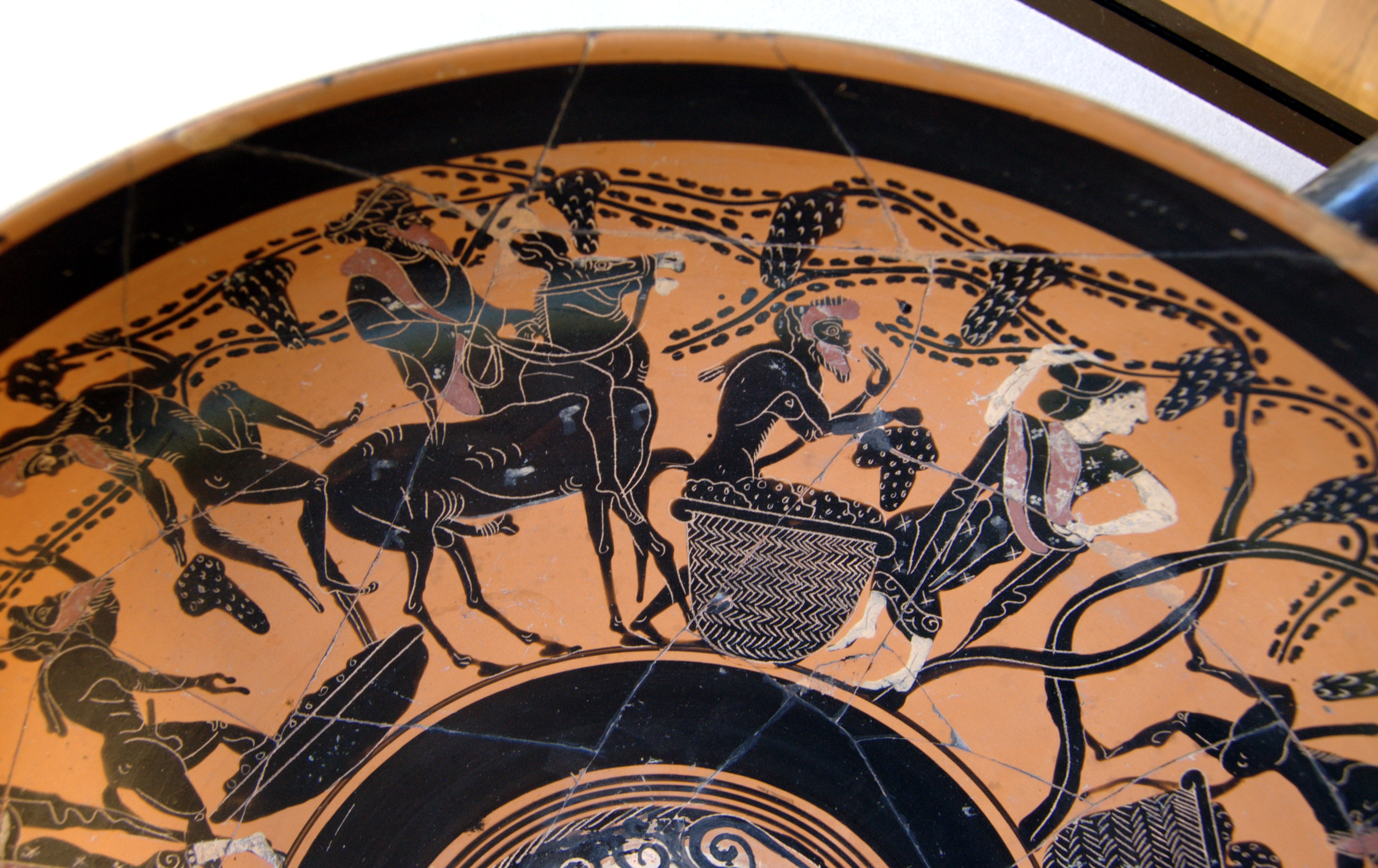
Procession of satyrs and maenads on the exterior of a kylix. Paris: Cabinet des médailles.

The Chiusi Painter was an Attic black-figure vase painter, active in the last quarter of the sixth century BC. His real name is not known.

The Chiusi Painter was part of the so-called Leagros Group, the last major important group of painters in the black-figure style. He is characterised by what John Boardman calls a "boring delicateness" compared to other artists of the group, failing to reach the standards of the Acheloos Painter for example.

== See also ==
- List of Greek vase painters

== Bibliography ==
- John Boardman: Schwarzfigurige Vasen aus Athen. Ein Handbuch, Mainz 1977, ISBN 3-8053-0233-9, p. 121
