= Antikensammlung Berlin =

Collection of ancient Greek, Roman, Etruscan and Cypriot artwork and archaeological finds

Coordinates: 52°31′08″N 13°23′53″E

The Antikensammlung Berlin (Berlin antiquities collection) is one of the most important collections of classical art in the world, now held in the Altes Museum and Pergamon Museum in Berlin, Germany. It contains thousands of ancient archaeological artefacts from the ancient Greek, Roman, Etruscan and Cypriot civilizations. Its main attraction is the Pergamon Altar and Greek and Roman architectural elements from Priene, Magnesia, Baalbek and Falerii. In addition, the collection includes a large number of ancient sculptures, vases, terracottas, bronzes, sarcophagi, engraved gems and metalwork.

== History of the collection ==
=== Foundation ===
The collection's foundations were laid in the time of the Brandenburg Elector Friedrich Wilhelm I by ancient sculptures looted in 1656 from the Villa Regia Palace in Warsaw. The obtained sculptures were purchased in Italy by Polish kings Sigismund III Vasa and Władysław IV Vasa. This core of the collection, originally housed at the Berlin City Castle, was enlarged through acquisitions, including the acquisition of the collection of Gerrit Reynst in 1671. Acquisitions continued in 1698 when Friedrich III bought the important collection belonging to the Roman archaeologist Giovanni Pietro Bellori. After a longer interval, in which Friedrich Wilhelm I exchanged, among other things, 36 valuable statues for two dragoon regiments with Augustus II the Strong, followed in 1742 by Friedrich II's purchase of the collection of cardinal Melchior de Polignac, which included the well-known figure of the "girl playing a game of knucklebones". He acquired in 1747 the already famous bronze statue of the so-called "praying boy", which was set up on the terrace of the Schloss Sanssouci until 1786. the collection was significantly expanded in 1758 through the inheritance of the Markgräfin von Ansbach-Bayreuth's collection, which included the "Nile mosaic" from Praeneste, and in 1764 through the purchase of Philipp von Stosch's antique gem collection.

The majority of the antiquities were scattered among the royal castles in the 1770s, or shown in a specially built ancient temple in Potsdam where they were not accessible to the public. 1797 saw the first thoughts of public access, with the plan to erect a public museum in Berlin to show off the most important pieces in the royal collections, among other things. A commission under the direction of Wilhelm von Humboldt was appointed to select the exhibits. At the same time as this new museum was coming into existence, further important purchases were made, for example in 1827 the collection of bronzes and vases belonging to the consul-general Bartholdy and in 1828 the collection of 1348 antique vases belonging to the general Franz Freiherr von Koller.

=== The collection to 1939 ===
The collection found its first home in the Karl Friedrich Schinkel's 1830 building (now the Altes Museum) in the Lustgarten next to the Stadtschloss. The collection was predominantly Greek and Roman in the beginning, though it also included some medieval and modern sculptures. In the course of the 19th century, many further purchases were made, including in 1831 the Dorow-Magnus collection of 442 vases. The vase collection was expanded significantly in the following years by the bequest of the archaeologist Eduard Gerhard's collection and became one of the best in the world.

The building's central room was the Rotunda, one of the earliest examples of purpose-built museum architecture, in which was exhibited the first display of sculptures, as chosen by von Humboldt's commission. Off it extended two halls, one of classical gods, the other of classical heroes, to which were joined two rooms with statues of Roman emperors, portraits, sarcophagi, cinerary urns and reliefs. Small objects were initially housed in the Antiquarium room.

The new museum's first director was the sculptor Christian Friedrich Tieck, and its first archeological curator (from 1833 to 1855) Eduard Gerhard. Even at this stage – thanks to Gerhard – the focus was not merely on displaying works of art, but also on scientific research and development, then a novelty in museums. A sign of this scientific approach was the beginnings of a systematic catalogue (with drawings) of the museum's ancient artworks from Italy and Greece. This collection of drawings grew fast and its 2500 leaves are used by researchers even in the present day.

During his term of office, Gerhard did not restrict himself to acquiring 'star objects', but instead tried to look at the whole breadth of the collection and to expand it in a variety of areas. In order to produce a complete overview of ancient art-history, he also went against opposition to casts and encouraged their acquisition by the collection instead of expensive original statues. The cast collection – in existence since 1796 at Berlin's Prussian Academy of Arts – was connected to the museum in 1842. In the following decades, the collection expanded to become one of the largest of its type. The combination of originals and copies in time came to support the museum's encouragement of research and scholarship.

The old museum-building soon became too small for the collection and a further building, the Neues Museum (New Museum), was built by Friedrich August Stüler between 1843 and 1855 to the north of the original building. In this new building, ideas of arranging the archeological collections into a full chronological and conceptual timeline began to become reality. In the lower floor of the museum the Egyptian collection (which had already existed for some years but not been accessible to the public) was put on show, whilst on the upper floor, the cast collection was set up according to designs by Stüler. The rooms' decor and wall paintings were designed specifically to fit the relevant subject or epoch. This new layout, however, did not last long, as in 1879 the vases collection was moved out of the Antiquarium into the new building.

Even though the vase collection had outgrown the storage capacity of the old building, the available space was still not enough, so in 1883 it was decided to separate off the post-ancient sculptures into their own collection, to be housed in the Kaiser-Friedrich-Museum (now known as the Bode Museum, or the Skulpturensammlung und Museum für Byzantinische Kunst i.e. the Sculpture Collection and Museum for Byzantine Art) that was already in the planning stages. Yet the 1884 purchase of the collection of Peter Alexandrovich Saburov again caused an acute shortage of space.

To expand of the collection, the museum had since 1875 carried out its own excavations around the Mediterranean, starting with the ruins of Olympia. In 1878 Carl Humann and Alexander Conze began excavations in Pergamon, which brought the museum its most famous object, the Pergamon Altar. Further excavations followed in Priene, Magnesia, Miletus and Baalbek, but these excavations entailed new problems.

The collection was enriched in the early 20th century by acquisitions as well as by excavations, such as that of smaller objects belonging to Friedrich L. von Gans in 1912, the glass collection purchased in 1913 from M. von Rath, the "Thronende Göttin" (Enthroned Goddess) in 1916, the statue of a woman holding an apple in 1925, and a collection of mummy portraits from the Fayum in 1929.

For the presentation of all these pieces of ancient architecture, another new museum building was required. Between 1897 and 1899, the architect Fritz Wolff created the first Pergamon Museum. It was opened 1901 and in its light well was displayed the Pergamon altar and other architectural examples. Yet problems with the foundations soon led to its closure and demolition closed and dismantled. Wilhelm von Bode in 1907 planned a new building, begun in 1912, but World War I and the Wall Street crash caused building work to come repeatedly to a standstill. In 1930, at the collection's centenary, a new museum (named the Pergamonmuseum from 1958) could be delivered finally at the public, designed by Alfred Messel and built by Ludwig Hoffmann. The three existing middle halls were reserved for ancient art.

The old left wing became the Deutsche Museum, to relieve severe space problems at the Kaiser-Friedrich-Museum. The right wing was reserved for the Near East collection and the museum of Islamic art. The three middle halls – after large extensions were added – were able to present ancient architecture to its full height, with innovative use of natural light. There was no discussion as to the form of this presentation, leading to some embittered disputes that became known as the "Berliner Museumskrieg" ("Berlin museum war"). Through connections between the three archaeological museums, from 1930 until the museums' closure on the outbreak of war in 1939 visitors were able to undertake a tour through the early high cultures of ancient Egypt, the ancient Near East and the antique world for the next nine years.

=== The "Kriegsinferno" ===
In 1941, safeguarding the objects with sandbags and other measures began. What could be moved was largely taken to the Flaktürme at the Berlin Zoo and at Friedrichshain, and in the vaults of the Berlin Mint. With the bombing becoming worse, these places (especially the Flak-towers) seemed unsuitable, and on 10 March 1945 it was decided to move the artworks to mines west of Berlin. After about ten convoys had started to move the collections there, however, it became too dangerous to do so, and this was postponed to the first week of April. So a large part of the small art and the supply of the magazines of the antique collection was instead taken to the Grasleben mines and to Kaiserroda in Thuringia. In the course of the war, the Altes Museum and the Neue Museum were destroyed, and the Museumsneubau and some of the exhibits were damaged. In spite of the concern over their safety, the art treasures in the Flaktürmen were hardly damaged during the Battle of Berlin.

The worst, however, came after the end of the battle, with the guards everywhere deserting their posts and leaving all the stores to be plundered by both Germans and Russians. In two fires in the Flakturm Friedrichshain in May 1945 a large part of the art treasures stored there was probably destroyed including several antiquities. Others were confiscated by the Red Army and taken back to Moscow and Leningrad as "spoils of war", and have still not been returned. How much was taken in this way is still unknown; 25 Greek vases that can be shown to belong to the Berlin collection were shown in 2005 at an exhibition entitled "Archaeology of the War" in the Pushkin Museum in Moscow. Further vases were discovered in the Muscovite Historic Museum. Several vases, that were loaned in 1903 to the Provincial-Museum at Poznań (13 of the 19 vases are demonstrably from the Berlin collection), and several portrait busts that were loaned from 1908 to the Schloss there, were subsumed by Poland in 1945 into the Muzeum Narodowe in Poznań, where they are still held today.

How great the losses were over the whole collection could first be investigated and documented after the reunification of the collection, with the first catalogue of losses appearing in 2005. This catalogue named five large bronze statues (including the "Calvatone Victory"), approximately 300 marble and stone statues, more than 40 reliefs, more than 20 stone architectural elements, approximately 30 stone vases, more than 1500 vases and vase-fragments (including pieces by the Amasis Painter, Berlin Painter, Brygos Painter, Edinburgh Painter, Exekias, Geras Painter and Pan Painter), 100 pieces of gold jewellery and more than 150 engraved gems.

=== The collection divided ===
==== The collection on the Museum Island ====
In 1958 the USSR returned much of this war bounty to the GDR, but with both the Altes and Neue Museum destroyed a new home was acutely needed for the collections on the Museums Island. The three middle halls of the Pergamon Museum once again housed architectural exhibits, and the central hall again housed the Pergamon Altar. In the right-hand Room was housed Roman architecture, and in the right wing itself the Near East Museum on the first floor and the Islamic Art museum on the upper floor (as it had been before 1939). In the left hall was housed Greek architecture, with ancient sculptures (formerly in the Altes Museum) in the left wing, and for a short time ancient coins were displayed in the Münzkabinett Berlin. On the upper floor were Roman portraits, Etruscan art and choice pieces from the collection of small-objects. There was no room, however, for the art of ancient Cyprus until the Altes Museum was rebuilt and these objects had to remain in storage.

A new entrance was formed in 1982, that led now directly into the middle hall and, from there, to the Pergamon Altar. In 1983–84 the ancient sculptures were redisplayed, this time in a chronological sequence, beginning with archaic Greek art, through classical originals, Hellenistic sculptures and Roman copies of classical originals, and ending with Roman art.

Kept out of the international art market, the collection was restricted to maintaining and presenting the existing collection on the Museum Island. Only in a few cases could the collection be enriched by new acquisitions, such as an outstanding Greek marble relief of two horsemen and seven precious vases from private owners.

==== The collection in Charlottenburg ====
Also in 1958 the objects that had been evacuated to Thuringia during the war (then moved by the Americans to Celle in West Germany) were returned to Berlin. Though a repatriation to the Museum Island was out of the question, other homes were found for the objects. In 1961 the antiquities (already on public display from 1960 in Stüler's barrack buildings at Schloss Charlottenburg) were placed in the charge of the Prussian Cultural Heritage Foundation. The objects displayed were the core of the collection of small artworks (including the well-known bronze statue of the "Cretan ram-carrier"), most of the former vase collection, the ancient gold jewellery collection (including the Hildesheim silver hoard), parts of the glass collection, the existing mummy portrait collections (with the addition of one of the few surviving ancient panel paintings, the Severus Tondo), and the collection of ancient helmets from Lipperheide. The display of antiquities, including the arrangement of the treasure chamber in the first floor of the Stüler building, was expanded in 1976. In 1987 the first floor became home to the vases from Magna Graecia, upon which the arrangement of the antiquities collection was complete and extensive.

In contrast to its East Berlin counterpart, the collection had access to the international art market, and was able to make its first postwar acquisition in 1958, the "torso of a falling wounded man". Up until reunification, as well as the existing material on the museum island, more than 600 new works of art were acquired by purchases and donation. These included numerous ancient vases (among others, the Altamura Painter, Berlin Painter, Brygos Painter, Chiusi Painter, KY Painter, Myson, Pan Painter, Paseas, Pistoxenos Painter, Smikros and the Triptolemos Painter), numerous marble busts (including a portrait bust of Cleopatra VII), sculptures (including a feminine idol of the Cycladic culture) and sarcophagus (among others, a large sarcophagus of a Roman general well known since the 16th century). Along with these single acquisitions, some larger complexes also came into the possession of the museum. In 1976 an ancient coin from Heinrich Amersdorffer's collection, gold jewellery from Tarentum in 1980, a vase collection from a grave in Tarentum in 1984 (including ones by the Armidale Painter, the Dareios Painter, the painter of Copenhagen 4223, the Loebbecke Painter, the Lucera Painter, the Underworld Painter and the Varrese Painter) and the contents of a late Roman grave in Cologne in 1986.
