= Niobid Painter =

Classical Greece vase painter

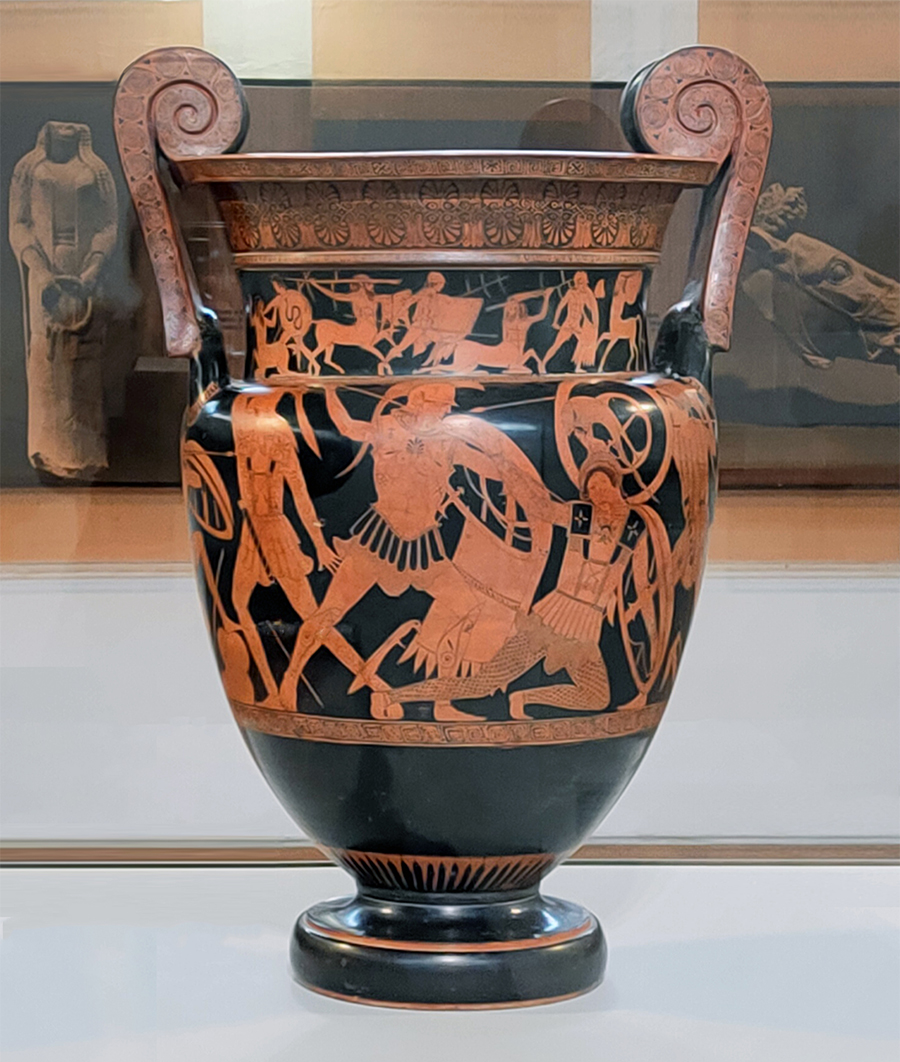
Amazonomachy scene with Achilles and Penthesilea. Side A of a red-figure krater, Agrigento Regional Archaeological Museum.

The Niobid Painter was an ancient Athenian vase painter in the red-figure style who was active from approximately 470 to 450 BC. He is named after a calyx krater which shows the god Apollo and his sister Artemis killing the children of Niobe, who were collectively called the Niobids. The krater is known as the Niobid Krater and is now housed at the Louvre in Paris. In his other work he shows a preference for Amazonomachy scenes and three-quarter-view faces.

His student Polygnotos continued his style of vase painting.

== Name vase ==
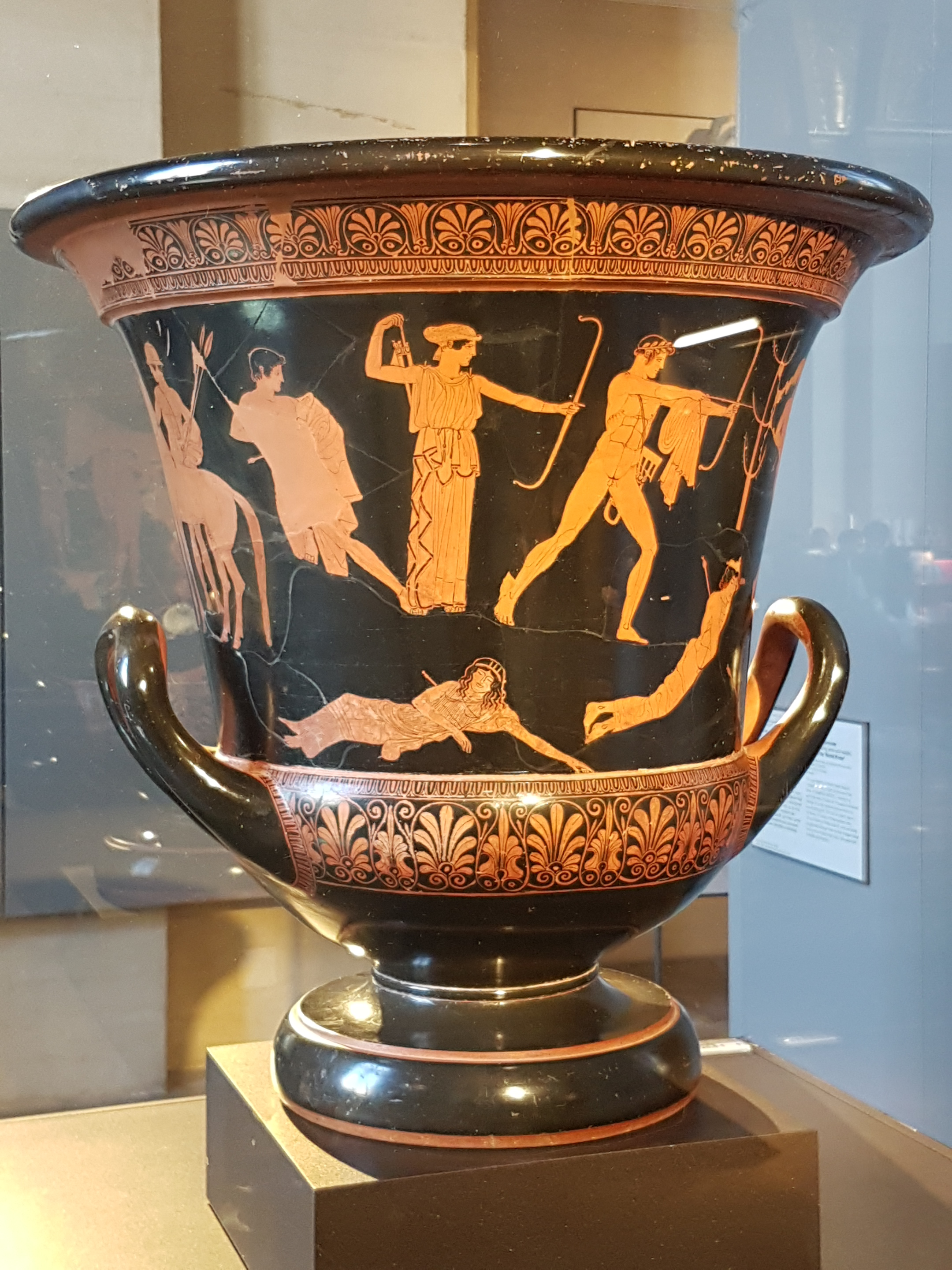
The Niobid Krater, Louvre

The massacre of the Niobids by Apollo and Artemis is shown on side B of the Niobid Krater. This story is rarely represented in Greek art. Niobe had bragged that she was superior to the goddess Leto because she had seven boys and seven girls, while Leto was mother to just two children, Apollo and Artemis. To punish Niobe for her hubris, Leto sent Apollo and Artemis to kill all of Niobe's children with arrows.

It is uncertain what is being depicted on side A as none of the figures is labeled. Only Heracles and Athena are clearly recognized. There are several hypotheses about what the other figures represent. One option is that they are the Argonauts awaiting favorable winds in Iolcos. Alternatively the scene depicts the episode of Heracles' descent into Hades to rescue Theseus and Pirithous, who were guilty of an attempted abduction of Persephone. Another possibility is that Heracles is a statue and that the men surrounding him are Athenian soldiers who wish to place themselves under the protection of the divine hero before the Battle of Marathon. The Athenians attributed their victory in that battle to the support of Heracles and instituted a cult to him.

A single arrow in the lower right corner of side B probably protrudes from a dead Niobid hidden behind the landscape. The implied presence of a body which is not actually represented was a remarkable novelty in vase painting. The Niobid Painter also attempted to draw the scenes in three dimensional space by adding multiple levels to the landscape where the scenes take place. This change was inspired by contemporary wall and panel paintings which also used multiple level compositions. However, this feature did not become popular in vase painting and the rest of the Niobid Painter's work used a single groundline.

== Other vases ==
- The Gela Krater, a volute krater with an Amazonomachy scene in the Agrigento Regional Archaeological Museum, Italy
- A volute krater with an Amazonomachy scene in the Museo Archeologico Nazionale di Napoli, Italy
- A calyx krater showing the creation of Pandora in the British Museum
- An amphora with a scene of Sappho teaching music in the Walters Art Museum, United States

== Sources ==
- Clark, Andrew J.; Elston, Maya; Hart, Mary Louise (2002). Understanding Greek Vases: A Guide to Terms, Styles, and Techniques. Los Angeles, California: Getty Publications. ISBN 9780892365999.
- Denoyelle, Martine (1995). Chefs-d'oeuvre de la céramique grecque dans les collections du Louvre. Paris: Louvre. ISBN 9782711829163.
- Denoyelle, Martine (1997). Le Cratère des Niobides. ISBN 9782711836222.
