= Eucharides Painter =

Ancient Greek vase painter

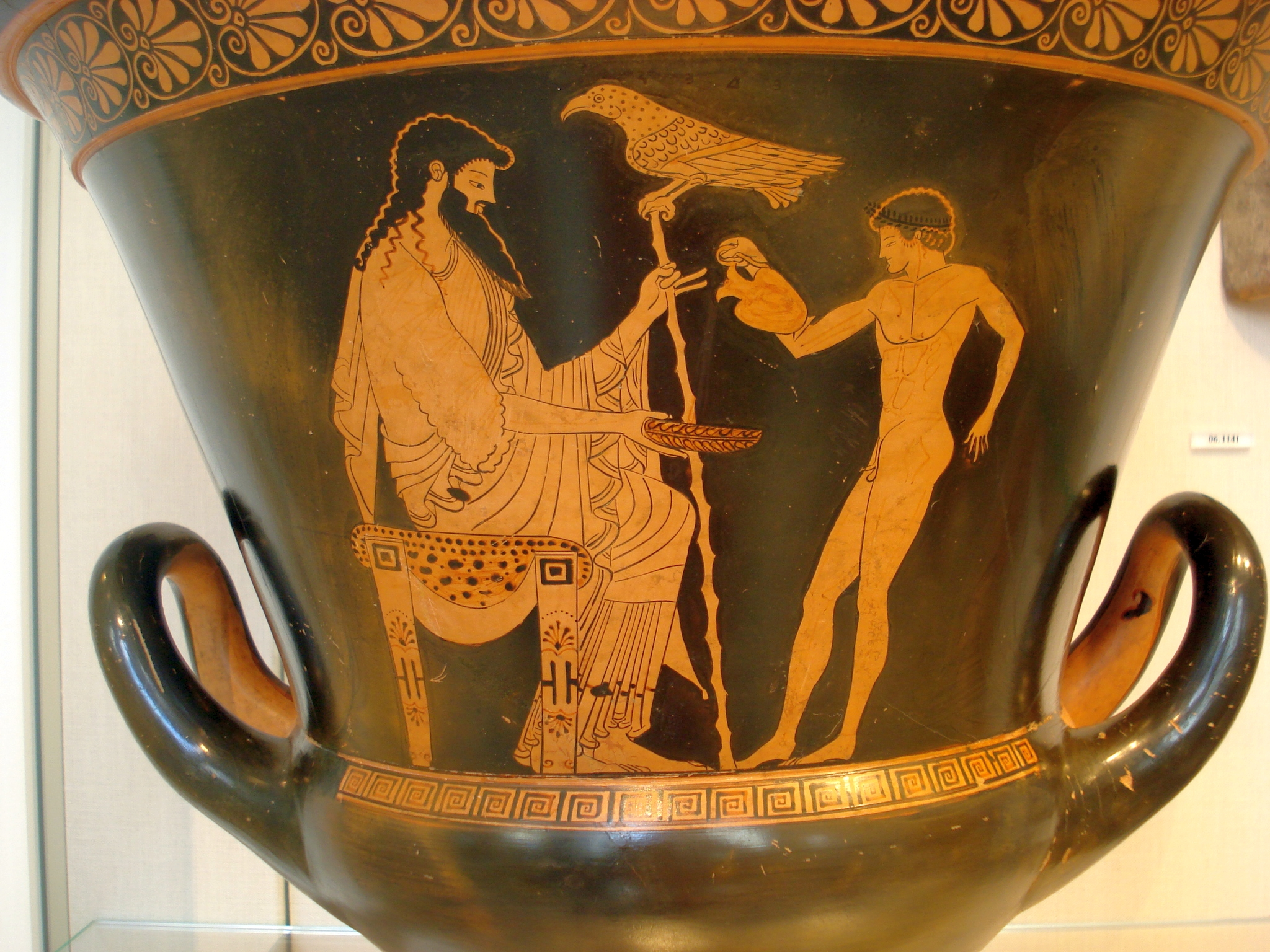
- Theme of Ganymedes showing kalos Eucharides
- Born: Unknown. Named by Beazley from kalos Eucharides, a named figure appearing frequently in his work. Before 500 BCE
- Died: About 470 BCE
- Known for: Vase painting
- Movement: Black-figure and red-figure at Athens

Eucharides Painter (Ancient Greek: Εὐχαρίδης) is the common nickname of an ancient Greek artist who decorated but did not sign Attic vases. Neither his real name, nor the dates of his birth and death are known. Presumably this artist was a pupil of the Nikoxenos Painter.

The name was introduced in 1911 by John Beazley, a classical historian at the University of Oxford, who had a special interest in Attic vases. Through close examination of stylistic details, Beazley and other scholars recognized pieces painted by the same artist. In this case, the nickname appreciates the anonymous painter's repeated use of kalos inscriptions praising the beauty of a named young boy. A vase with the inscription ΚΑΛΟΣ ΕΥΧΑΡΙΔΕΣ ("kalos Eucharides", i.e. Eucharides is beautiful) became the source of the artist's name.

The Eucharides Painter was working in Athens in the years from about 500 BC to 470 BC. At this time the technique of vase painting switched from black-figure to red-figure illustrations, a process commonly attributed to the Andokides Painter. Correspondingly, both black-figured and red-figured vases are attributed to the Eucharides Painter. Their shapes range from large kraters to small cups. Scenes were drawn from mythology and daily life.

Many of this artist's known works were retrieved from Etruscan tombs in Italy. Recently, one of his attic vases was claimed to be looted and was repossessed by the Italian State. NY Observer NY Times

== Vases ==
Examples of Attic vases attributed to the Eucharides Painter are on display around the world, e.g.:

- Getty Museum, Malibu, California, USA (no. 86.AE.227). Attic red-figure water jar illustrating a young boy and a reveller with the eponymous inscription

Kalos Eucharides (Beazley Archive Database Number 275122)

- Vatican City, Museo Gregoriano Etrusco Vaticano (no. H545) Attic red-figure hydria illustrating a scene from Homer´s Iliad, the killing of Hektor by Achilles (Beazley Archive Vase Number 202267)
- London, British Museum (no. B178). Attic black-figured amphora illustrating Dionysos with Ivy and Kantharos between Satyrs. (Beazley Archive Vase Number 302996).
- Paris, Musée du Louvre. Attic red-figure amphora illustrating Satyre et Menade.
- St. Petersburg, The State Hermitage Museum. (Inv. No. Б. 2604). Attic red-figure hydria-kalpis illustrating Nike with tripod.
- Hamburg, Museum für Kunst und Gewerbe. Attic red-figure wine amphora illustrating the killing of Argos by Hermes.
- Bremen, Antikenmuseum im Schnoor/ Sammlung Zimmermann.

Black-figured pseudo-panathenaic amphora.

- Copenhagen, National Museum Attic red-figured stamnos illustrating a Woman with a Mirror, a Seated Youth Looks at a Dog. Inscription.

Beazley Archive Database Number 202230

== Literature ==
- Beazley, J. D., Attic Red figured Vase Painters, 2nd edition (Oxford, 1963) [= ARV²]
- Beazley, J. D., Attic Black-figure Vase-painters (Oxford, 1956)
