= Leagros Group =

Ancient Greek vase painting studio

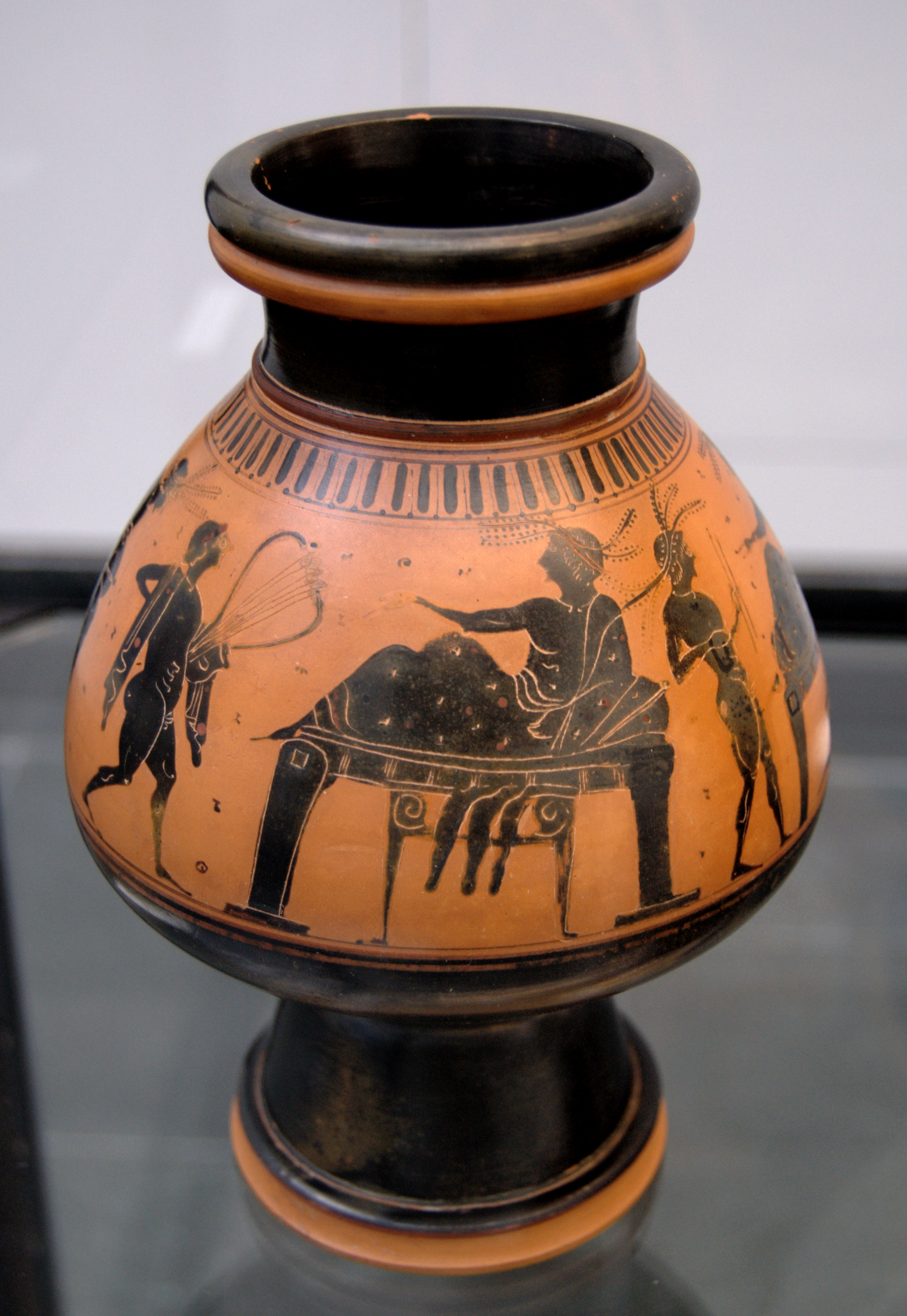
Symposion scene on a psykter, circa 510 BC. Munich: Staatliche Antikensammlungen.

The Leagros Group was a group of Attic black-figure vase painters active during the last two decades of the 6th century BC. The name given to the group by modern scholars is a conventional one, derived from a series of name vases.

The Leagros Group was the final important group of Attic vase painters in the black-figure style to paint large-format images on vases. Their significance is so great that their time of activity is also known as the Leagros period. About 400 vases are ascribed to the group; most of them are hydria and neck amphorae, constituting about half of the group's surviving products. Additionally, they painted other types of amphorae, kraters, lekythoi, and, in small amounts, some other shapes. The group's conventional name is derived from five vases with kalos-inscriptions mentioning the ephebe Leagros.

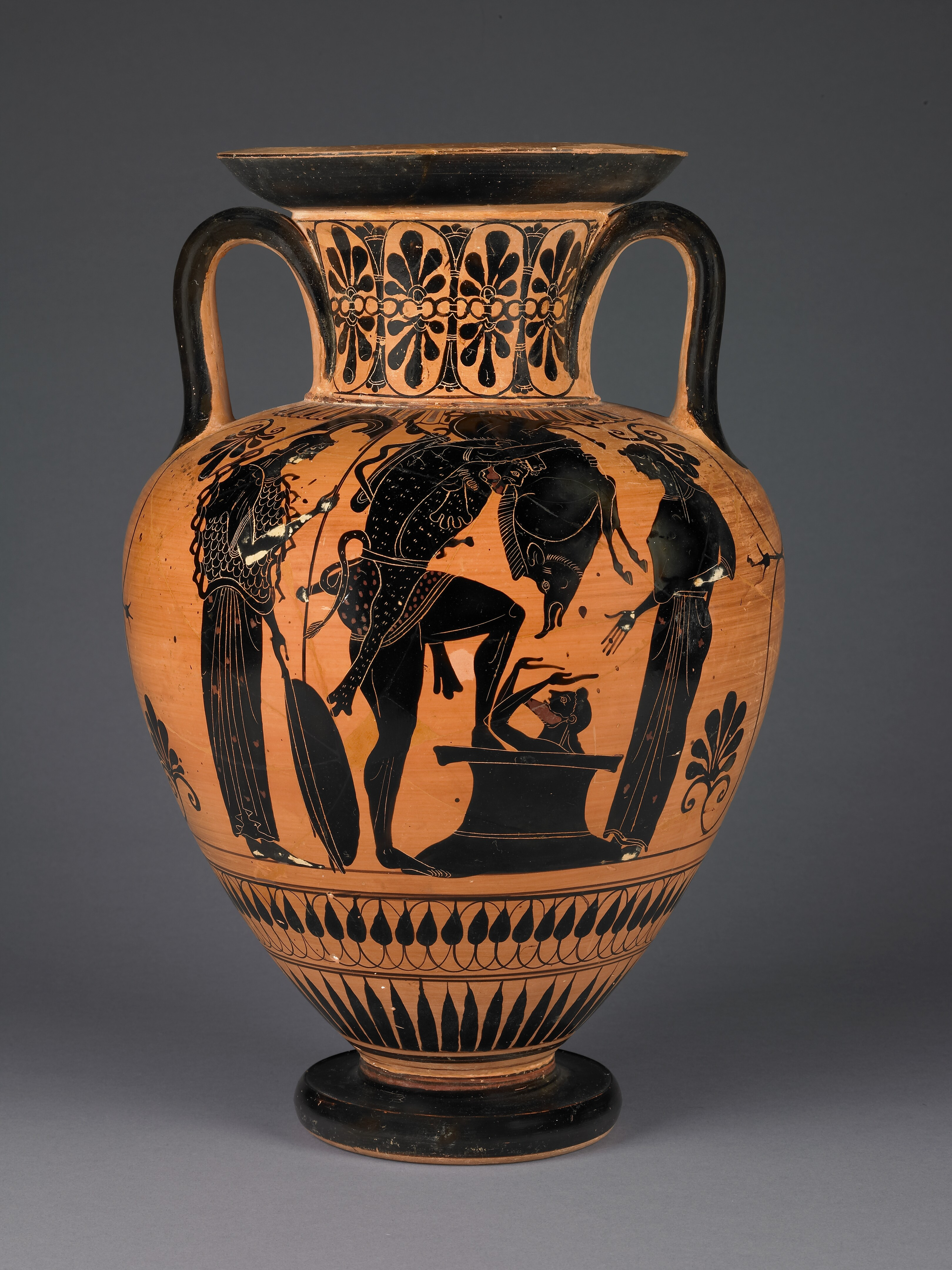
Herakles carries the Erymanthian boar to Eurystheus, who is hiding in a large sunken storage vessel. Circa 510 BC. Malibu: Getty Museum.

Hydriai by the group resemble those by the Antimenes Painter, feature more widely flayed lips and shallower broader shoulders. The earlier animal frieze predellas and frame lines decorated with ivy leaves are now replaced by palmettes with broad separate leaves. They are organised in rounded loops. Such patterns are rare in black-figure vase painting, but very popular in the red-figure style contemporary with the Leagros Group. At times, the Leagros Group painters used the white-ground technique on the necks of their amphora, again a feature introduced by the Antimenes Painter. The decoration of their neck amphorae is also similar to his, but the vegetal ornaments on the necks are more carefully painted and the lotus flowers look rather like celery stalks.

Their figural scenes, for the last time, demonstrate the power and complexity of the black-figure style. They include complex scenes with multiple figures, often overlapping. The incisions are forceful and clear, the depiction of anatomic detail is restrained. Additional colours are only used to a limited extent. Garment folds and patterns only occur rarely and in little detail. Thus, the Leagros Group artists demonstrate the strong points of the black-figure style, while the contemporaneous Pioneer Group show the possibilities offered by the newly introduced red-figure technique, veritably indulging in details of anatomy and clothing. The Leagros Group achieved to adopt some of the innovations associated with the new technique within the limits of their style. Muscles and textiles are depicted in a reduced form. The small eyes of their figures are another striking feature. The group's artists profit particularly from innovations in terms of perspective and spatial depictions, although they use them rarely. All figures feature idealised proportions of body and facial expression. Compared to the figures by the Antimenes Painter, they appear quite sturdy. The group does not waste available space; its image fields are usually well filled. That they do not appear crammed is due to the compositional talent of the painters. The compositions are balanced, convincing and full of tension. Sometimes, details extend beyond the margins of the pictorial field proper.

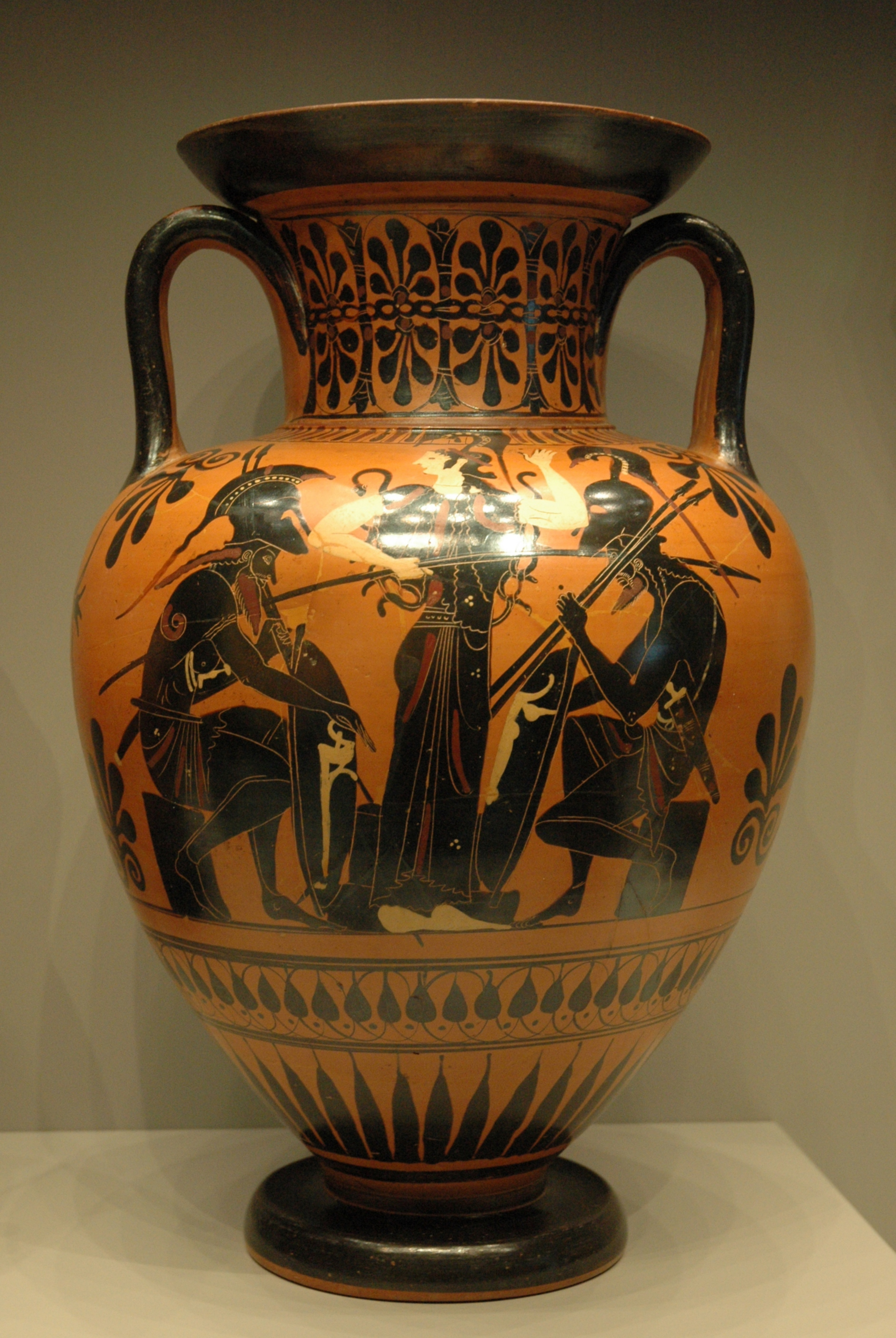
Achilles and Ajax playing a board-game, neck amphora, circa 510 BC. Malibu: Getty Museum.

Within the group, several smaller sub-groups and individual painters can be identified, albeit with considerable difficulty, due to the very homogenous styles of the painters. The most significant individual artists are the Acheloos Painter and the Chiusi Painter. The group favoured mythological themes, especially scenes from the Trojan War and the adventures of Herakles. For example, the scene of Achilles and Ajax playing a board game is depicted several times. Some motifs were newly introduced by painters of the Leagros Group, others depicted and interpreted in new ways. Although similar changes took place in red-figure vase painting, the two developments should probably be seen as separate, in spite of the possibility of a degree of mutual influence. Leagros Group painters may have been active in the same workshops as Pioneer Group ones, as is suggested by the fact that the kalos name Leagros also occurs on vases by Euphronios, Phintias and Euthymides. The links and mutual influences among the two groups remain disputed. John Boardman sees them exist side-by-side, Heide Mommsen suggests a major degree of interaction.

== Bibliography ==
- John Beazley: Attic Black-Figure Vase-Painters, Oxford 1956, p. 354-391, 695f.
- Paralipomena. Additions to Attic black-figure vase-painters and to Attic red-figure vase-painters. Oxford 1971. p. 160-172
- The Development of Attic Black-figure. Rev. ed. Dietrich von Bothmer and Mary B. Moore. Berkeley 1986. 74-80 ISBN 0-520-05593-4
- John Boardman: Schwarzfigurige Vasen aus Athen. Ein Handbuch, Mainz 1977, ISBN 3-8053-0233-9, p. 120-122
- Heide Mommsen: Leagros-Gruppe, in: Der Neue Pauly Vol. 6 (1999), Col. 1203
