= Pelike =

Shape of ancient Greek vase

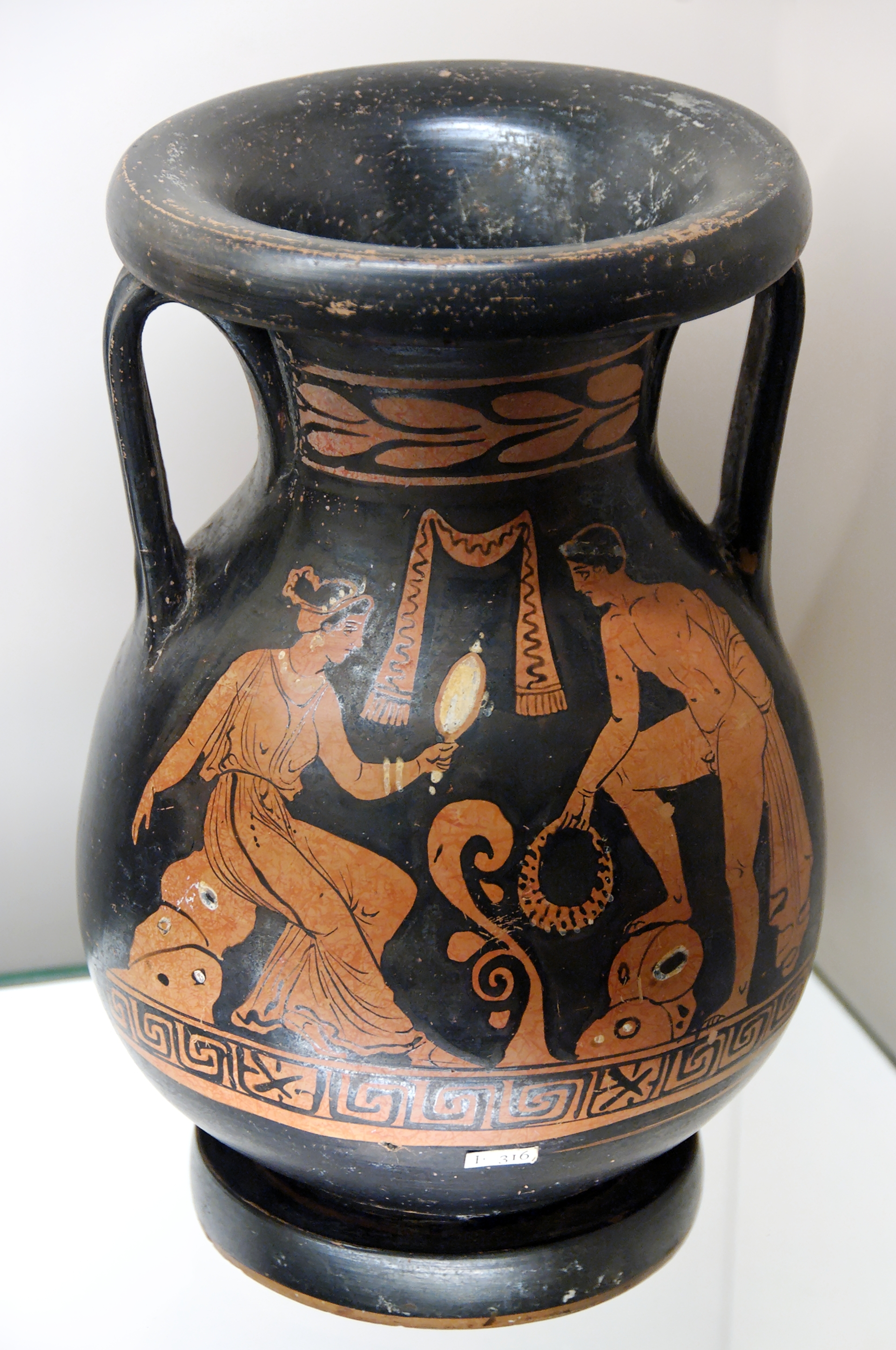
Woman and a youth, Apulian red-figure pelike, c. 370 BCE, British Museum (F 316)

A pelike (Ancient Greek: πελίκη) is a one-piece ceramic container similar to an amphora.

It has two open handles that are vertical on their lateral aspects and even at the side with the edge of the belly, a narrow neck, a flanged mouth, and a sagging, almost spherical belly.

Unlike the often-pointed bottom of many amphorae, the pelike's bottom is always flanged so it will stand on its own.

Pelikes are often intricately painted, usually depicting a scene involving people. The shape first appeared at the end of the 6th century BCE and continued to the 4th century BCE.

The pelike's function is not known for certain, but many classical experts speculate, due to its shape, the locations they have been found and the subject matter they are decorated with, that pelikes were wine containers.
