= Department of Classics, King's College London =

Department at King's College London

Coordinates: 51.512220°N 0.115831°W

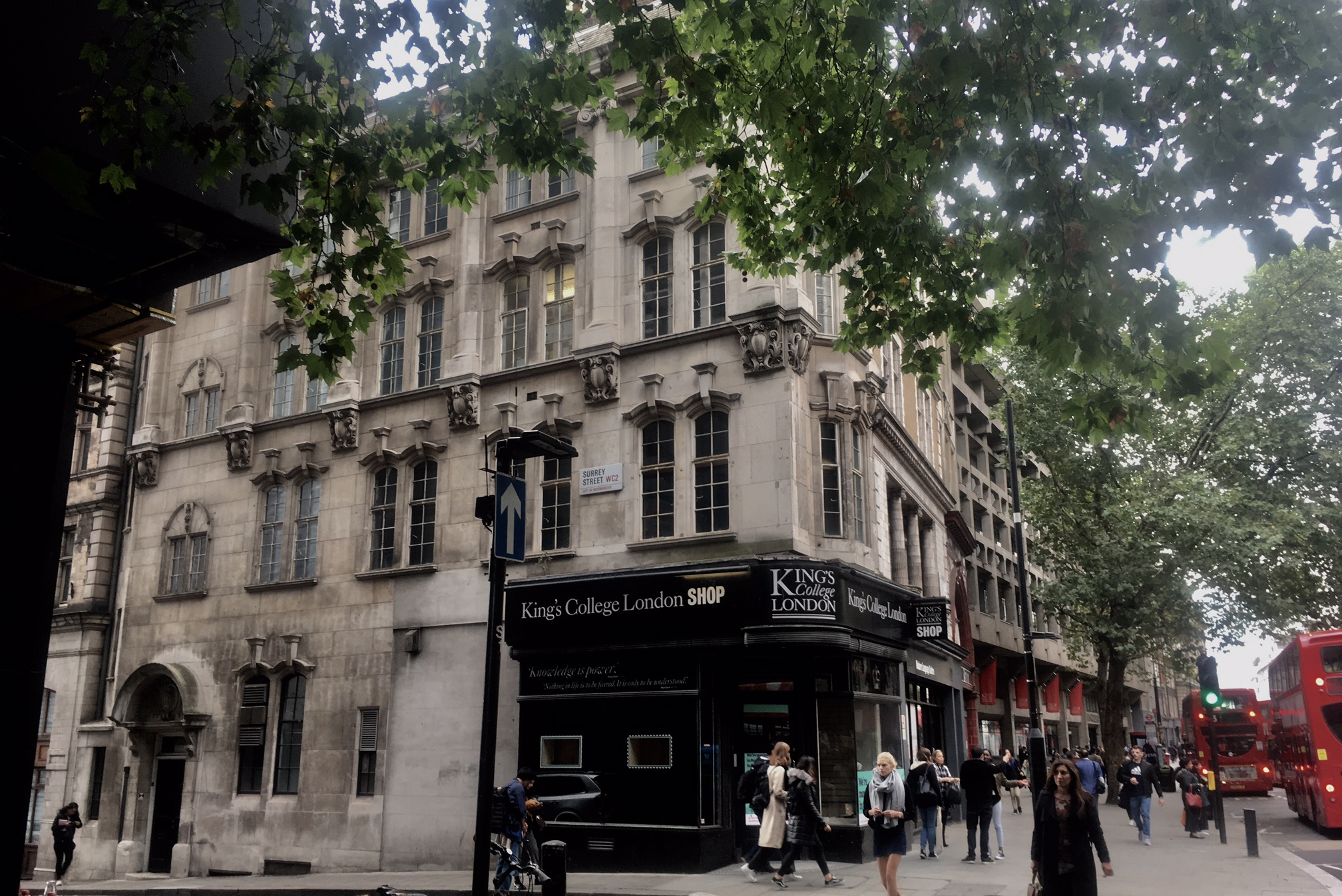
- Established: 1831
- Parent institution: Faculty of Arts and Humanities, King's College London
- Head of Department: Will Wootton
- Location: Strand, London, United Kingdom
- Website: Department of Classics

The Department of Classics is an academic division in the Faculty of Arts and Humanities at King's College London. It is one of the oldest and most distinguished university departments specialising in the study of classical antiquity in the United Kingdom.

== History ==
=== Foundation ===
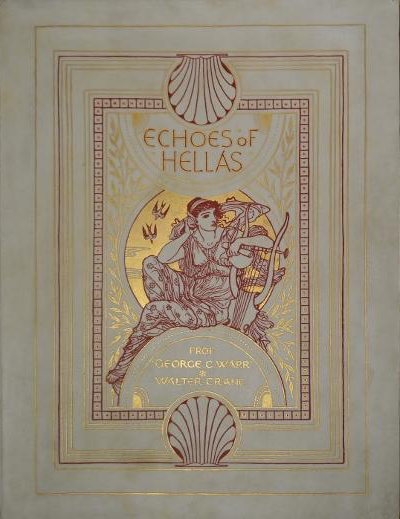
Echoes of Hellas title page (1887)

King's College was established in 1829 under the patronage of George IV. Its royal charter outlined its mission as "the general education of youth in which the various branches of Literature and Science are intended to be taught, and also the doctrines and duties of Christianity [...] inculcated by the United Church of England and Ireland." The College counted among its founders and benefactors the Duke of Wellington, who was Prime Minister at the time, and a number of other eminent politicians and theologians of the British Establishment.

The College included a Chair of Classical Literature as part of its foundational setup. Classical subjects, along with Law, Literature and Theology, were therefore taught at King's from the day it first formally opened its doors in 1831. The inaugural Professor of Classical Literature was the English scholar Joseph Anstice, whose introductory lecture on the enduring significance of classical education marked the beginning of what is today the Classics Department.

=== The Tale of Troy ===
The Tale of Troy is the title given to a series of famous performances in London between 1883 and 1887.

George Charles Winter Warr, Professor of Classical Literature from 1879 to 1901, developed an adaptation of the Iliad and the Odyssey entitled The Tale of Troy. Four performances were scheduled in late May and early June 1883, two in English and two in the original Greek. The goal was to raise sufficient funds to secure premises in Kensington for the newly founded King's College Lectures for Ladies.

Although originally planned on a modest scale, the end product was a lavish spectacle staged in the South Kensington mansion of Sir Charles and Lady Freake. The plays were attended by prominent figures in scholarship, art, music, theatre and high society. The production was revived in May 1886, this time to raise funds for the extension of university teaching in London. This expanded version was moved to Prince's Hall in Piccadilly and included the story of Orestes, adapted from Aeschylus's Oresteian Trilogy. The Prince and Princess of Wales were also in attendance. The complete final version was published in 1887 under the title Echoes of Hellas with illustrations by Walter Crane.

=== The Koraes Chair ===
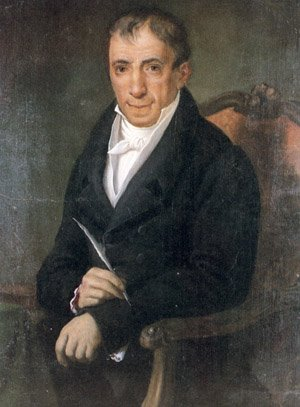
Adamantios Koraes

The Koraes Chair of Modern Greek and Byzantine History, Language and Literature was established at King's College in 1918 to serve as the focal point in Britain for Hellenic studies beyond antiquity. It was championed by the likes of the Anglo-Hellenic League and by Eleftherios Venizelos, then Prime Minister of the Hellenic Parliament and a close friend of King's College Principal Ronald Montagu Burrows. Burrows was himself a famous classical scholar and philhellene.

The Koraes Chair is named in honour of Adamantios Koraes, the founding father of the modern Greek nation state. Its inauguration also marked the beginning of the Department of Byzantine and Modern Greek Studies, which has itself since been merged into the Department of Classics.

The Koraes Chair was recently held by Roderick Beaton for a thirty-year period from 1988 to 2018. It is currently held by the Belgian-American scholar Gonda Van Steen.

=== Second World War ===
The Parthenon sculptures were hidden directly underneath the department in the tunnels of the now-disused Strand station during the Second World War. They were only brought back to the British Museum in nearby Bloomsbury in 1948, where they have remained since.

The work of the original Chair of Classical Literature was split into two separate Chairs of Greek and Latin during this period.

=== Modern Era ===
The Centre for Hellenic Studies (CHS) was established at the Department in 1989 to promote research and scholarship of Hellenic history, culture and language. On Greek Independence Day in 2010, plans were announced for the CHS to include teaching alongside its research activities. Under these new arrangements the CHS also came to incorporate the Department of Byzantine & Modern Greek Studies.

A public dispute arose in 2010 over plans to axe the last Chair of Paleography in the United Kingdom and wider English speaking world. Principal Rick Trainor announced the controversial plans as part of a College restructuring project. The issue was debated as an Early Day Motion in Parliament.

The British parliamentarian Boris Johnson visited the College in 2011 as Mayor of London to deliver a speech on the importance of classical education.

In 2014, the Centre for Hellenic Studies merged its teaching and research activities with the Department of Classics. The CHS continues to be a prominent research centre of its own in the Arts & Humanities Research Institute (AHRI).

== Location ==
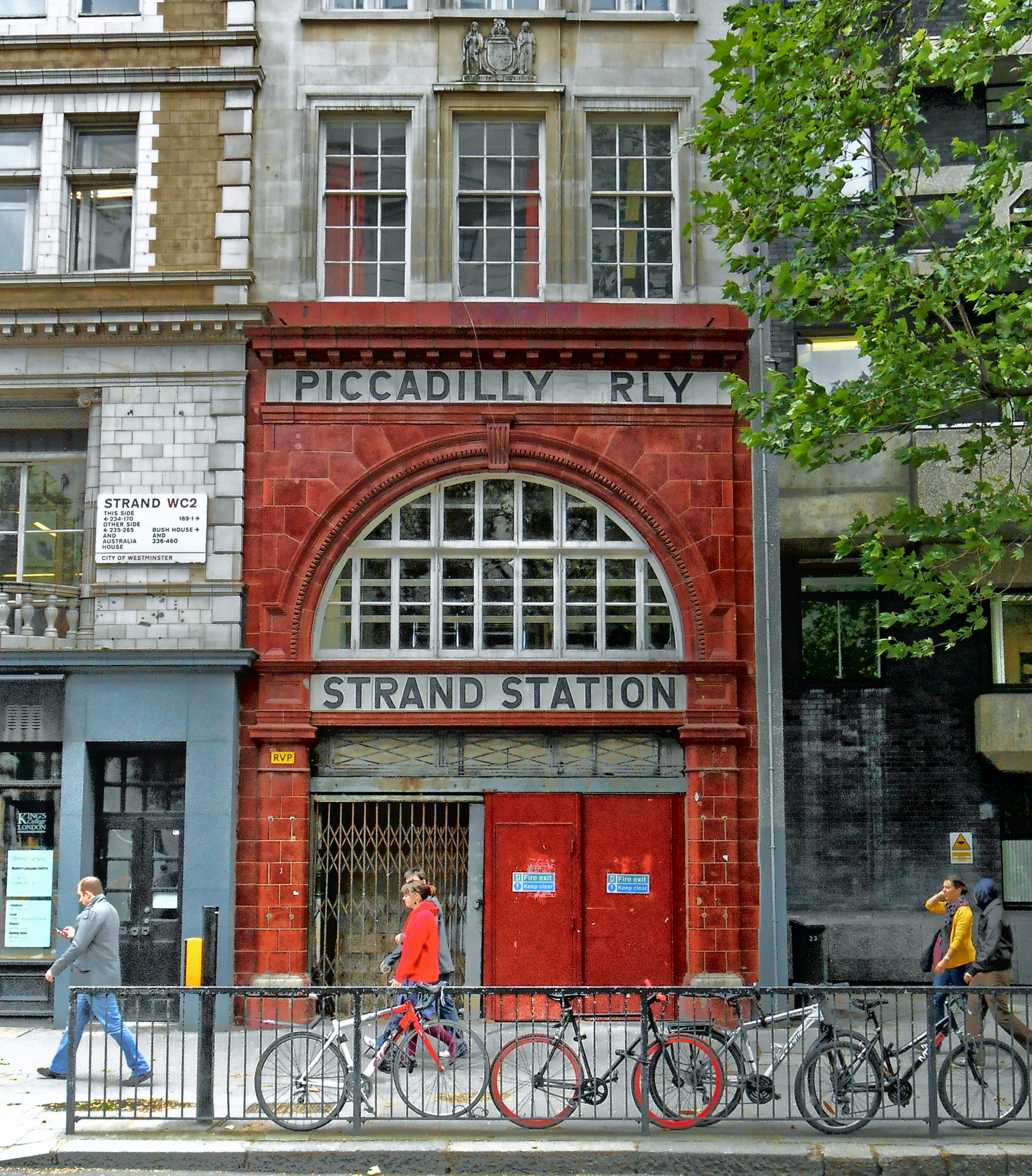
169 Strand

The Department of Classics is located on the historic Strand. It occupies a set of buildings at the corner of Surrey Street which are linked internally through a series of corridors and staircases. 169 Strand was purpose-built for College use in 1928 above the disused Strand station and features the old King's coat of arms on its facade. The Royal Strand Theatre stood on this site from 1832 until its demolition in 1905. 170 Strand contains offices, teaching rooms and the department common room with a balcony overlooking the street. 171 Strand is a corner house with retail operating on ground floor level. Academic offices extend along 39 to 41 Surrey Street.

The King's College London Rifle & Pistol Club (KCLRPC) has occupied the Strand underground tunnels beneath the department as their shooting range since the 1920s.

The vaults at the rear of the Surrey Street buildings house the old Roman Baths on Strand Lane.

== Reputation ==
In the most recent Research Excellence Framework (2014), the department ranked 7th out of 22 in the United Kingdom for research. The Complete University Guide ranked Classics at King's as 11th nationally in 2019, and in its 2022 Guide, it ranked Classics as 16th and history (inclusive of ancient history) at 10th. In 2018, the QS World University Rankings ranked the department at 5th nationally and 21st globally. In the Guardian University Guide, Classics & ancient history at King's was rated 22nd out of 26 in 2020, rising to 15th out of 25 in 2021.

== Traditions ==
The King's Greek Play has been an annual tradition since 1953. It is the only dramatic production in the United Kingdom to be performed every year in the original ancient Greek language. The production has also previously toured America and Canada. The Department of Classics houses a physical archive of related materials and recordings.

Every year on the first Thursday of February, the department hosts its annual Runciman Lecture named in honour of Sir Steven Runciman. The lectures were established in the early 1990s and funded in perpetuity by the Czech count and artist Nicholas Egon. The event is traditionally preceded by an Orthodox Vespers in the College Chapel on the Strand.

The Jamie Rumble Memorial Fund was established in 2013 through a major donation from a former student. The Rumble Fund sponsors field trips where students have the opportunity to engage directly with the classical lands in their studies. Travel destinations have so far included Athens and Rome, with future trips to sites in Cyprus, Sicily, North Africa and Turkey proposed. The Rumble Fund also subsidises an annual guest lecture in classical art.

The Department of Classics also supports the Iris Project, an educational charity designed to promote study of the classical world to state schools in the United Kingdom. Students in the department have the opportunity to teach Latin to disadvantaged children.

Student life in the department is administered by the Classics Society (formerly the Classical Society). The Society publishes a journal titled the New Satyrica. A new undergraduate research journal, Kerberos, was also launched in 2018. There is a common room at 170 Strand which previously housed the departmental library.

The Classics Society hosts an annual Winter Ball.

== People ==
=== Academics ===
- Joseph Anstice, Professor of Classical Literature (1831-1835)
- George Charles Winter Warr, Professor of Classical Literature (1879-1901)
- Arnold Joseph Toynbee, Koraes Professor of Modern Greek & Byzantine History, Language & Literature (1919-1924)
- Edwyn Robert Bevan, Lecturer in Hellenistic History and Literature (1922-1933)
- Leonard Robert Palmer, Professor of Classical Literature (1945-1946), Professor of Greek Language & Literature (1946-1952)
- Romilly James Heald Jenkins, Koraes Professor of Modern Greek & Byzantine History, Language & Literature (1946-1960)
- Reginald Pepys Winnington-Ingram, Professor of Greek Language & Literature (1953-1971)
- Howard Hayes Scullard, Professor of Ancient History (1959-1970)
- Cyril Alexander Mango, Koraes Professor of Modern Greek & Byzantine History, Language & Literature (1963-1968)
- Donald MacGillivray Nicol, Koraes Professor of Modern Greek & Byzantine History, Language & Literature (1970-1988)
- Alan Cameron, Professor of Latin Language & Literature (1972-1977)
- John Barron, Professor of Greek Language and Literature (1971–1980), Head of Department (1972–1984), Dean of the Faculty of Arts (1976–1980), Director of the Institute of Classical Studies (1984–1991), Dean of the Institute of Advanced Study (1989–1991)
- Averil Millicent Cameron, Professor of Ancient History (1978-1989)
- Geoffrey Waywell, Professor of Classical Archaeology (1987-2004)
- Roderick Beaton, Koraes Professor of Modern Greek & Byzantine History, Language & Literature (1988-2018)
- Michael Silk, Emeritus Professor of Classical & Comparative Literature
- Judith Herrin, Constantine Leventis Senior Research Fellow
- Charlotte Roueché, Professor Emeritus of Digital Hellenic Studies
- Mary Beard, Lecturer in Classics (1979-1983)
- William Fitzgerald, Professor of Latin Language & Literature
- Edith Hall, Professor of Classics
- Gonda Van Steen, Koraes Professor of Modern Greek & Byzantine History, Language & Literature

=== Alumni ===
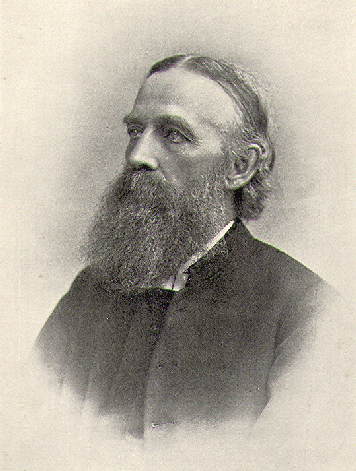
Alfred John Church

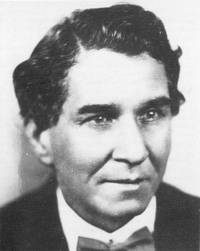
Matthew Phipps Shiell

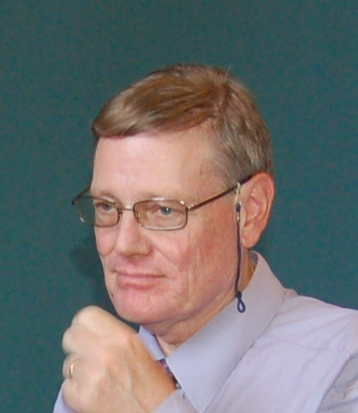
Roger Bland

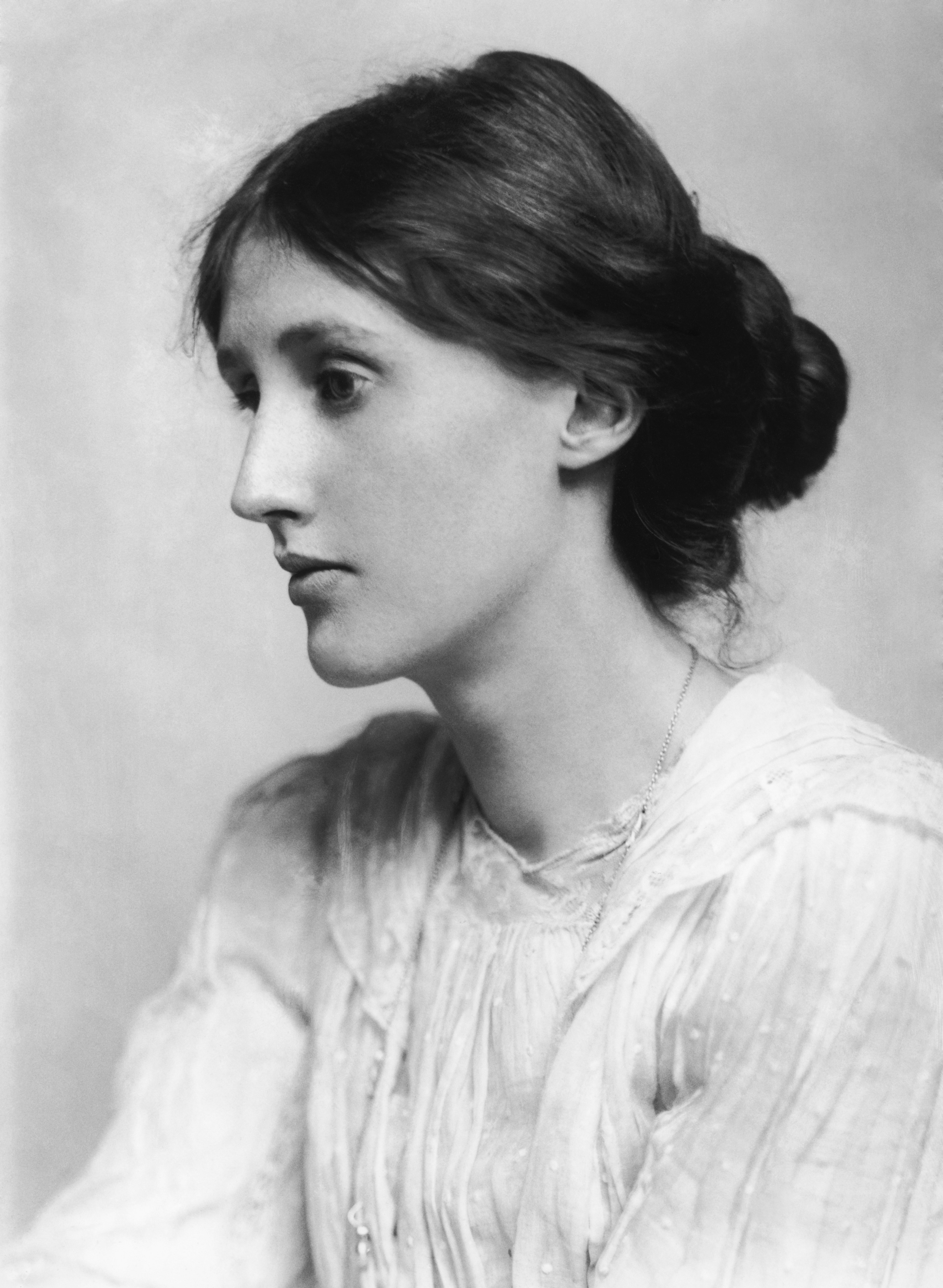
Virginia Woolf
- Alex Beard, Chief Executive of the Royal Opera House
- Alfred John Church, Professor of Latin at University College London (1880-1888)
- Anthony Crockett, Bishop of Bangor (2004-2008)
- Donald William James Woodman, Headmaster of Portadown College (1946-1973)
- Dorothy King, author and archaeologist
- Edward Perchard, Editor of Resource Media
- Emily Parker, Tours & Choir Manager at Monteverdi Choir
- Francesca Spiegel, academic at Humboldt University of Berlin
- Jack Baldwin, West End actor
- Jacob Lipton, Programme Director of the Systemic Justice Project, Harvard Law School
- Jacob Samuel Klein, Associate Professor of Philosophy, Colgate University
- John Manners-Bell, Chair of the Logistics and Supply Chain Global Agenda Council of the World Economic Forum
- John Psaropoulos, Editor-in-chief of Athens News (1999-2009)
- Julia Jordan, lecturer at University College London
- Marie Louise Cookson, narrator and voice over artist
- Matthew Phipps Shiell, writer
- Nona Shepphard, Associate Director at the Royal Academy of Dramatic Art
- Michael Harley, pastor and committee member of the Trinitarian Bible Society
- Philip Egan, Bishop of Portsmouth
- Ralph Jackman, writer
- Roger Bland, former curator at the British Museum and Senior Fellow of the McDonald Institute for Archaeological Research, University of Cambridge
- Virginia Woolf, writer and pioneering modernist

== See also ==
- Faculty of Arts & Humanities at King's College London
