= Modern Greek studies =

Study of modern Greek language, literature, and culture

Modern Greek studies (Greek: Νεοελληνικές Σπουδές) refers to an academic discipline of the humanities whose object is the linguistic, literary, cultural as well as geographical and folkloristic exploration and teaching of Greek in the world (Greece, Cyprus and the Greek diaspora) in the Modern Age and present time. A number of universities and research centers focus on Modern Greek studies.

== Universities ==
In 1919 there was the establishment of the Koraes chair of Modern Greek and Byzantine History, Language, and Literature, at the University of London. At Oxford University there is the Bywater and Sotheby Chair of Byzantine and Modern Greek Language and Literature, now the Stavros Niarchos Foundation–Bywater and Sotheby Professor of Byzantine and Modern Greek Language and Literature. While at the University of Cambridge there is the position of 940), is Lecturer in Modern and Medieval Greek.

Members of the Australian Greek community have expressed concern about the decline in Modern Greek Studies as a discipline.

== Subjects ==
During the 1960-1980s, the discipline of Modern Greek studies was dominated by the study of Modern Greek literature, that is poetry and prose. With important work being done on authors such as C. P. Cavafy, Nikos Kazantzakis, Giorgos Seferis, Odysseas Elytis, and Yannis Ritsos. After the 1980's additional methods were incorporated like critical theory and cultural studies. In the last decades there has been a decline in western Universities offering Modern Greek studies.

== Institutions ==
- Hellenic Institute of Byzantine and Post-Byzantine Studies in Venice
- University of Chile Center for Byzantine and Neohellenic Studies
- Seeger Center for Hellenic Studies, University of Princeton

== Organisations ==
- European Society of Modern Greek Studies
- Modern Greek Studies Association

== Journals ==
- Bulletin de Correspondance Hellénique Moderne et Contemporain
- Byzantine and Modern Greek Studies
- Journal of the Hellenic Diaspora
- Journal of Modern Greek Studies
- Modern Greek Studies (Australia and New Zealand), University of Sydney

== Notable people ==
- Simos Menardos (1872-1933), Modern Greek dialectology and toponymy
- Mario Vitti (1926-2023), Italian philologist
- Edmund Keeley (1928-2022), American scholar of Modern Greek poetry

== Literature ==
- Swanson, D. C. (1960). Modern Greek studies in the West; a critical bibliography of studies on modern Greek linguistics, philology, and folklore, in languages other than Greek. New York: New York Public Library.

== See also ==
- Byzantine studies
- Hellenic studies
