= Georgios Giannakopoulos =

Greek historian

Georgios Giannakopoulos (Greek: Γεώργιος Γιαννακόπουλος) is a Greek historian of modern Europe and international relations. He is Senior Lecturer in Modern History at City St George's, University of London. His research concerns the history of internationalism and international order, British imperial history, and the intellectual and political history of southeastern Europe.

Giannakopoulos is the author of The Interpreters: British Internationalism and Empire in Southeastern Europe, 1870–1930 (2025) and a co-editor of The War for Anatolia and the Remaking of International Order: Greece, Turkey and the End of the First World War (2025).

== Education and academic career ==
Giannakopoulos studied history and politics at Panteion University in Athens and received a PhD in Modern History from Queen Mary University of London.

He is Senior Lecturer in Modern History and Associate Dean in the School of Policy and Global Affairs at City St George's, University of London. He has also served as Associate Editor for the Social Sciences of the Journal of Modern Greek Studies.

== Scholarship ==
Giannakopoulos's research examines modern European and international history, with particular attention to Britain and southeastern Europe and to questions of internationalism, empire, nationalism and intervention.

His first monograph, The Interpreters: British Internationalism and Empire in Southeastern Europe, 1870–1930, was published by Manchester University Press in 2025 as part of its Studies in Imperialism series. The book examines cultural and intellectual exchanges between Britain and southeastern Europe during a period of imperial transformation. It considers the management of ethnic difference in multinational empires, including Britain, Austria-Hungary and the Ottoman Empire, and traces the role of British scholars and public intellectuals in interpreting the national questions of southeastern Europe for British and international audiences.

The book received scholarly and press attention. Reviewing it in History, Ross Cameron described it as a contribution to the historiography of Britain and the Balkans, highlighting its treatment of British intellectual engagement with southeastern Europe in relation to imperial governance and the management of national diversity.

In the Greek newspaper To Vima, historian Christos Triantafyllou discussed Giannakopoulos and the book in an extended review essay on cultural mediation and imperial thought. The essay situated his work within recent historiographical interest in the relationships between global history and geographical and political borderlands.

In 2025, Giannakopoulos co-edited, with Gonda Van Steen and Joseph A. Maiolo, The War for Anatolia and the Remaking of International Order: Greece, Turkey and the End of the First World War, published by Bloomsbury Academic. The volume places the Greco-Turkish War (1919–1922) within the wider transformation of international order following the First World War, examining forced migration, humanitarianism, nationalism, minority protection and the reconstruction of regional capitalism.

Reviewing the collection in Immigrants & Minorities, Mehmet Erman Erol situated it within scholarship challenging a Versailles-centred account of the end of the First World War. He argued that the volume places the Anatolian conflict within broader global transformations and described it as a significant scholarly contribution to understanding the regional and international consequences of the conflict.

Giannakopoulos also co-authored the volume's concluding chapter with Cemil Aydin, examining the aftermath and legacy of the "1922 moment" and its relationship to international order and civilisational politics.

The two books were discussed together at Yale University's Hellenic Studies Program in November 2025, where Giannakopoulos presented them in relation to the wider question of how national conflicts became problems of international governance.

Giannakopoulos's research also includes the history of diplomacy and consular networks in the nineteenth-century Mediterranean. In 2026, he received a British Academy/Leverhulme Small Research Grant for The World that Consuls Made: British Diplomacy in 19th-Century Greece, a project examining British consular networks in Greece between 1832 and 1914. Drawing on British and Greek archives and a prosopographical study of consular careers, the project examines consuls as diplomats, merchants and legal authorities operating amid changing sovereignties in the eastern Mediterranean. It includes case studies of Syros, Corfu, Patra, Salonica and Herakleion and is intended to produce an open searchable dataset of British consuls in Greece.

== Global 1922 ==
Giannakopoulos co-convened involved in the Global 1922 project, which sought to place the Greek-Turkish conflict of 1919–1922 and its aftermath within a global historical context. The project brought together scholars working on the international dimensions and legacies of the conflict and formed part of wider scholarly activity surrounding the centenary of 1922.

The project received an Innovation Award from the Modern Greek Studies Association, supporting a conference and related activities examining the global history of the Greek-Turkish conflict.

The project's international conference was also covered by the Greek magazine LiFO, which discussed its attempt to examine 1922 beyond established national narratives and through its wider international and global dimensions.

== Selected works ==
- Giannakopoulos, Georgios (2025). The Interpreters: British Internationalism and Empire in Southeastern Europe, 1870–1930. Manchester University Press. ISBN 9781526160133.
- Giannakopoulos, Georgios; Maiolo, Joseph A.; Van Steen, Gonda, eds. (2025). The War for Anatolia and the Remaking of International Order: Greece, Turkey and the End of the First World War. Bloomsbury Academic. ISBN 9781350420946.
