= Faculty of Arts and Humanities, King's College London =

Coordinates: 51.511510°N 0.115425°W

Faculty of Arts & Humanities, King's College London
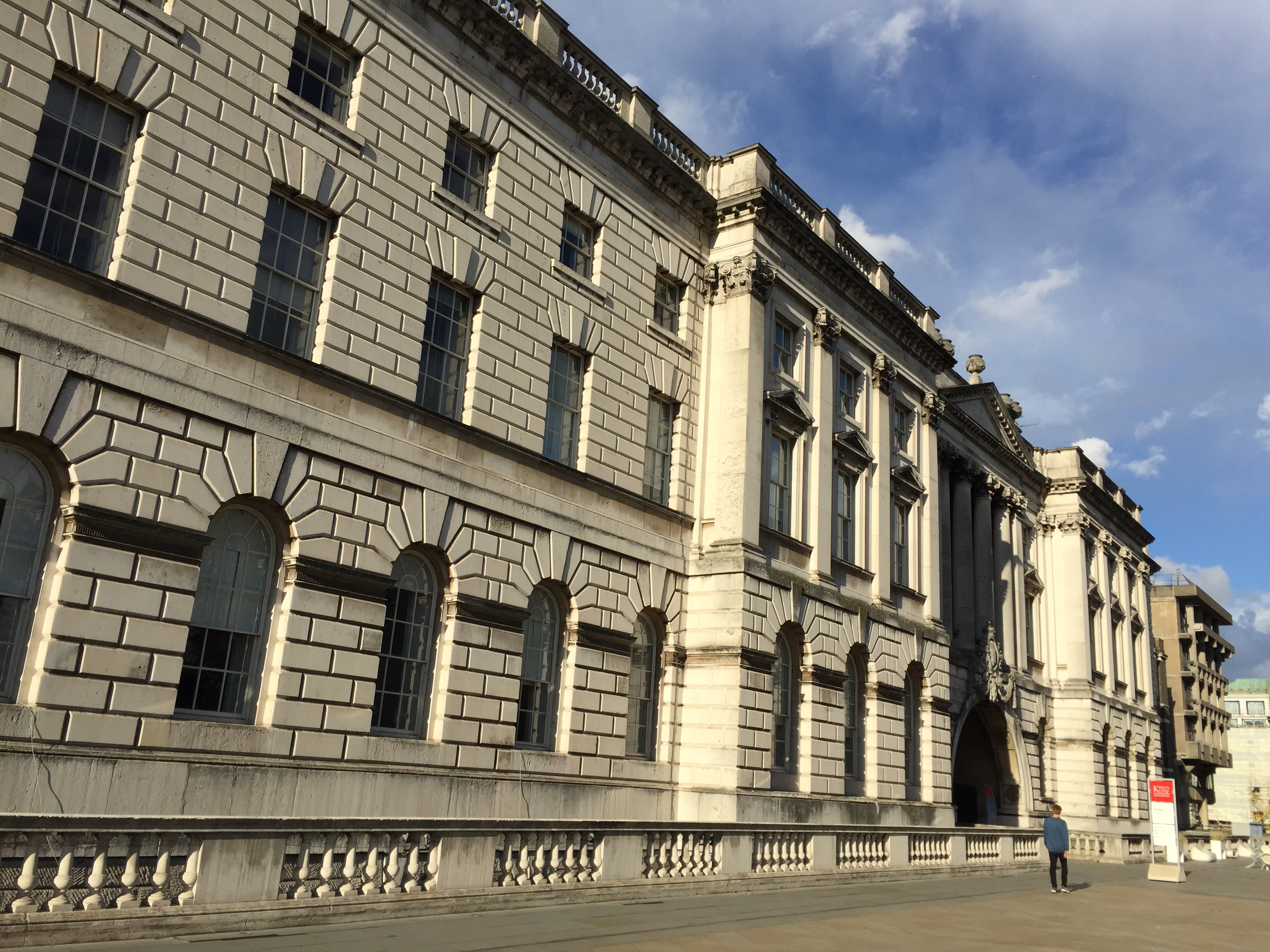
- Former names: King's College, London Faculty of Arts (1831); King's College, London Faculties of Music and Theology (1831); King's College London School of Humanities (1988); King's College London School of Arts and Humanities (2009); King's College London Faculty of Arts & Humanities (2014)
- Established: 1831; 195 years ago
- Parent institution: King's College London
- Dean of Faculty: Simon Tanner
- Location: London, United Kingdom
- Website: kcl.ac.uk/artshums/
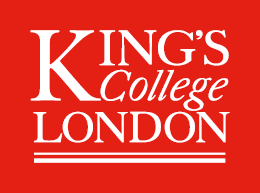

H.G.Koenigsberger

The King's College London Faculty of Arts & Humanities is one of the nine academic Faculties of study of King's College London. It is situated on the Strand in the heart of central London, in the vicinity of many renowned cultural institutions with which the Faculty has close links, including the British Museum, Shakespeare's Globe, the National Portrait Gallery and the British Library. In the 2024 Times Higher Education World University Rankings by subject, King's Arts & Humanities ranked in the top twenty worldwide.

The Faculty of Arts & Humanities offers study at undergraduate and graduate level in a wide range of subject areas. Many of the departments and programmes offer joint undergraduate degrees, including some with the Departments of Geography and War Studies, in the Faculty of Social Science & Public Policy, and with Mathematics in the Faculty of Natural & Mathematical Sciences. As a member of the Russell Group and the Golden triangle, the Faculty receives a high number of applications.

The Faculty is a member of The Council of University Deans of Arts, Social Sciences and Humanities (DASSH UK), and of London Citizens. The current Executive Dean of Faculty is Professor Simon Tanner, who took over in an interim position from Professor Marion Thain in November 2024.

== History ==
In the late 1980s, King's College London's Faculty of Arts merged with the Faculties of Music and Theology as the School of Humanities and took on the name of the School of Arts & Humanities in 2009. The original Arts departments such as War Studies and Geography formed part of the Faculty known now as Social Science & Public Policy while the Arts & Humanities expanded from its 'classical' humanities roots. Over the past few years, the Faculty has established interdisciplinary programmes such Liberal Arts and led new developments in teaching and research, for instance through the Department of Digital Humanities, Department of Culture, Media & Creative Industries.The School of Arts & Humanities became the Faculty of Arts & Humanities in 2014.

In 2023, the Digital Futures Institute and the Global Cultures Institute were launched as part of a new Faculty vision to showcase how arts and humanities expertise were addressing some of society's most pressing challenges.

== Departments ==
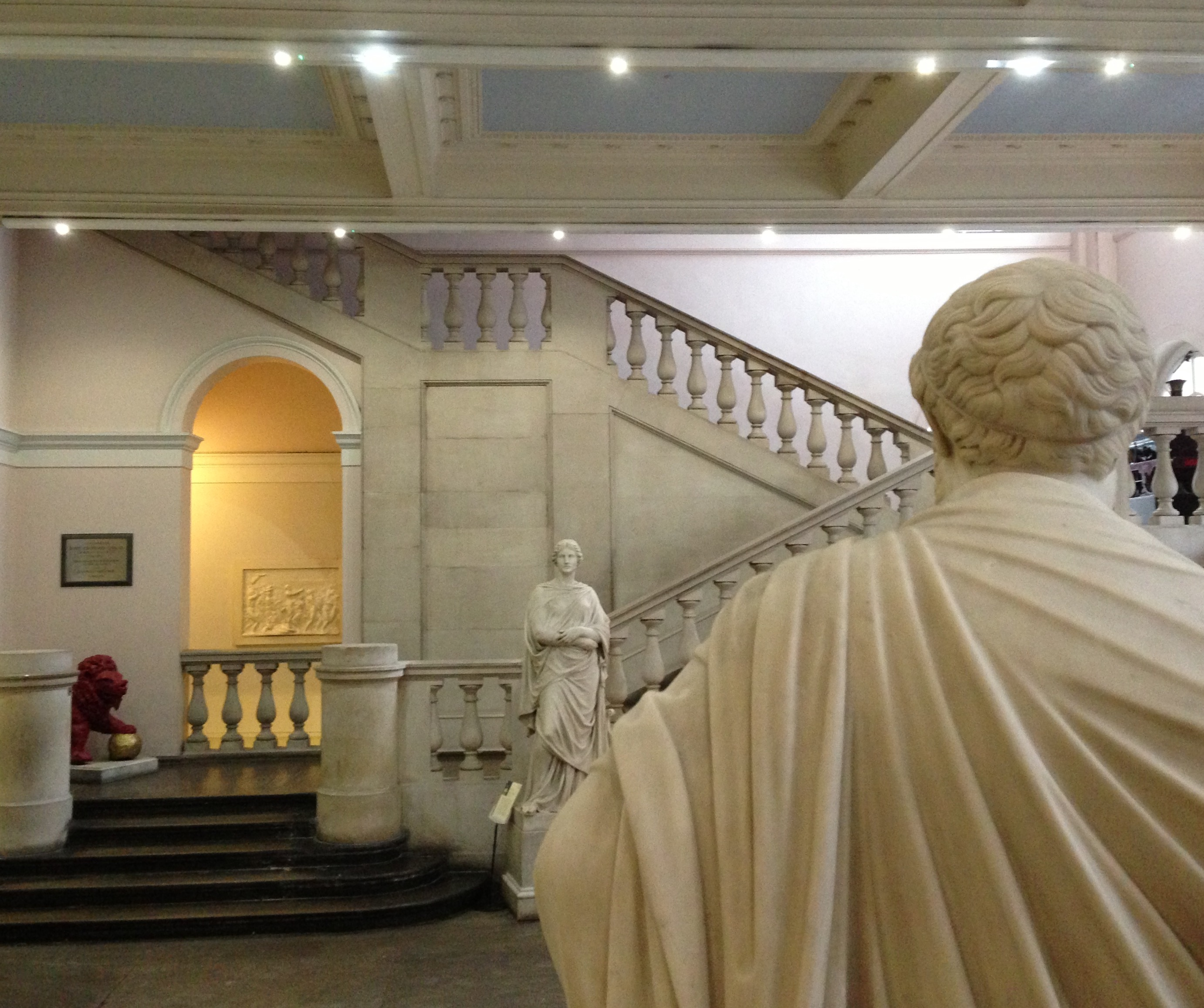
Greek marble statues at the main hall of King's Building: lyric poet Sappho (fronting) and dramatist Sophocles (back turned)

The following departments and centres can be found in the Faculty of Arts & Humanities:

- Classics
- Culture, Media & Creative Industries
- Digital Humanities
- English
- Film Studies
- History
- Languages, Literatures and Cultures
- Interdisciplinary Humanities
- Music
- Philosophy
- Theology & Religious Studies

== Notable people ==
=== Current Professorial staff ===
- George Benjamin, Henry Purcell Professor of Composition
- Francisco Bethencourt, Charles Boxer Professor
- Fay Bound Alberti, Professor in Modern History
- David Carpenter, Professor of Medieval History
- Julia Crick, Professor of Palaeography and Manuscript Studies
- Kate Devlin, Professor of Artificial Intelligence & Society
- Richard Drayton, Rhodes Professor of Imperial History
- David Edgerton, Hans Rausing Professor of the History of Science and Technology
- Paul Gilroy, Professor of American & English Literature
- Paul Joyce, Samuel Davidson Professor of Old Testament/Hebrew Bible
- Paul Readman, Professor in Modern British History
- Martin Stokes, King Edward Professor of Music

=== Former academic staff ===
- Roderick Beaton, Koraes Professor of Modern Greek & Byzantine History, Language & Literature
- Harrison Birtwistle, British contemporary composer
- Averil Cameron, Warden of Keble College, Oxford, Professor of Late Antique and Byzantine History in the University of Oxford, and Pro-Vice-Chancellor of the University of Oxford
- A. G. Dickens (1910-2001), historian, former Director of the Institute of Historical Research
- Richard Dyer, Professor of Film Studies
- Simon Gaunt, Professor of French Literature
- John Eliot Gardiner, English conductor
- John Elliott, historian
- Edith Hall, Professor of Classics
- F. J. C. Hearnshaw (1869-1946), historian
- Judith Herrin, Emeritus Professor of Late Antique and Byzantine Studies
- Brian Hurwitz, D'Oyly Carte Professor of Medicine & the Arts
- Efraim Karsh, Founding Director and Emeritus Professor of Middle East and Mediterranean Studies
- H.G.Koenigsberger, Professor of History
- Mario Vargas Llosa, Peruvian writer, politician, journalist, essayist, and Nobel Prize laureate
- P. J. Marshall, Emeritus Rhodes Professor of Imperial History, President of the Royal Historical Society from 1997 to 2001
- Janet Nelson, Emeritus Professor of Medieval History, President of the Royal Historical Society from 2001 to 2005
- Richard Overy, historian
- Roger Parker, Thurston Dart Professor of Music
- Curtis Price, Warden of New College, Oxford
- David Profumo, an English novelist, 6th Baron Profumo
- Conrad Russell, 5th Earl Russell (1937-2004), 5th Earl Russell
- Richard Sorabji, Emeritus Professor of Philosophy
- Susan Stebbing (1885-1943), Lecturer in Philosophy
- Joan E. Taylor, Professor of Christian Origins and Second Temple Judaism
- Patrick Wright, Professor of Literature and Visual & Material Culture

=== Deans of Faculty ===
- Barry Ife (Spanish): August 1989 - July 1997
- Linda Newson (Geography): August 1997 - July 2000
- Michael Knibb (Theology): August 2000 - July 2001
- David Ricks (CHS/CompLit): August 2001 - July 2004
- Ann Thompson (English): August 2004 - December 2007
- Jan Palmowski (German): January 2008 - December 2012
- Simon Gaunt (French): January 2013 - December 2013
- Russell Goulbourne (French): January 2014 - August 2018
- Jo Malt (French): September 2018 - December 2018 (Interim)
- Marion Thain (English): December 2018 - October 2024
- Simon Tanner (Digital Humanities): November 2024 - Present Day (Interim)

=== Notable alumni ===
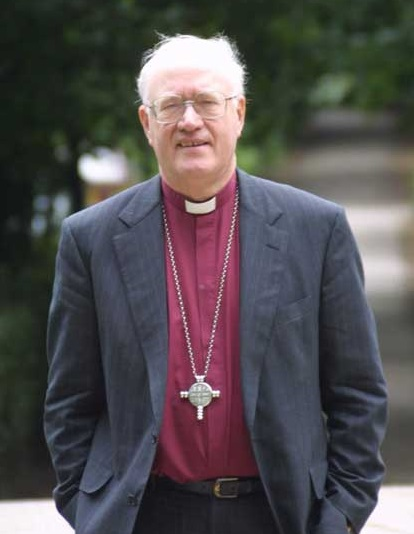
Lord Carey

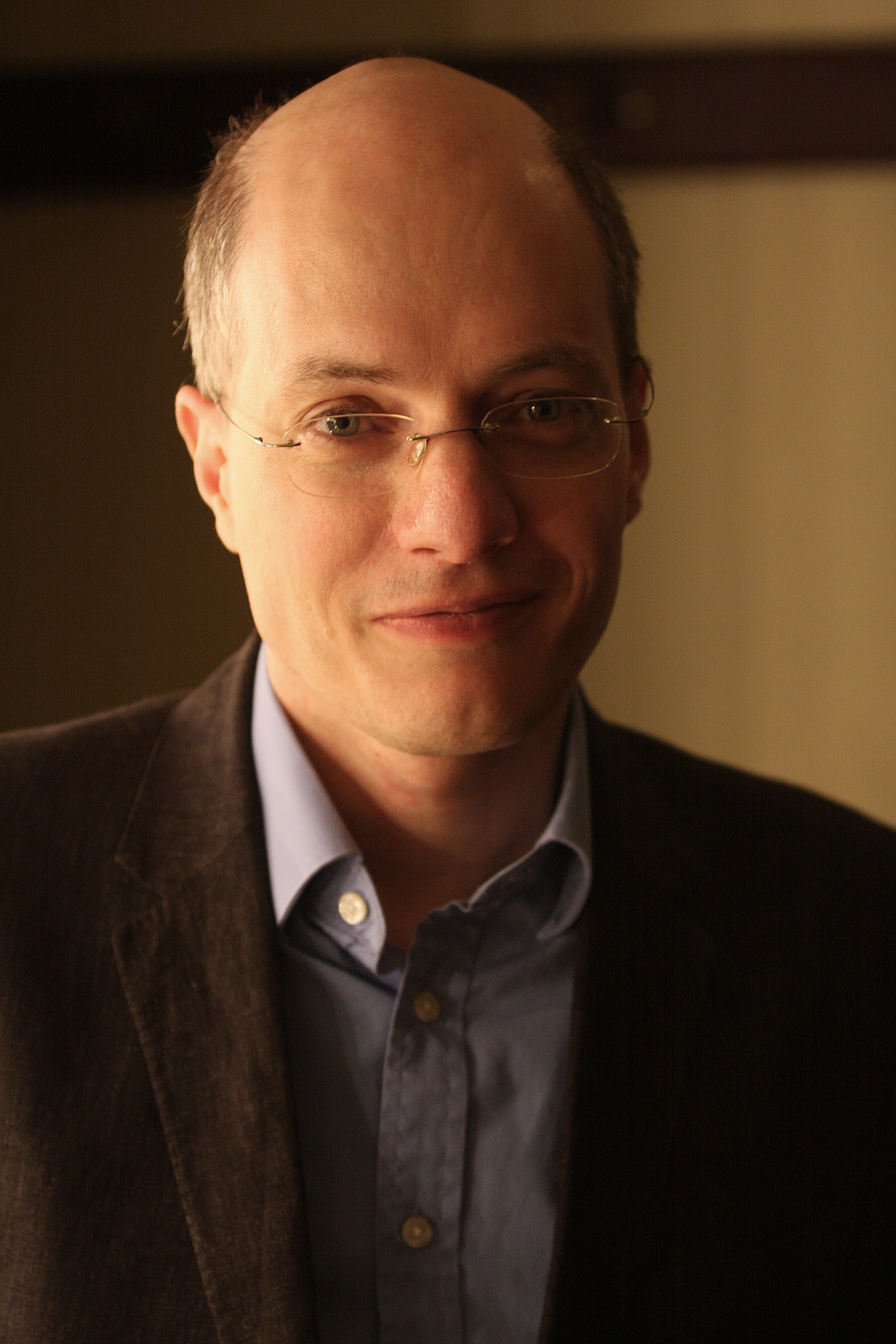
Alain de Botton

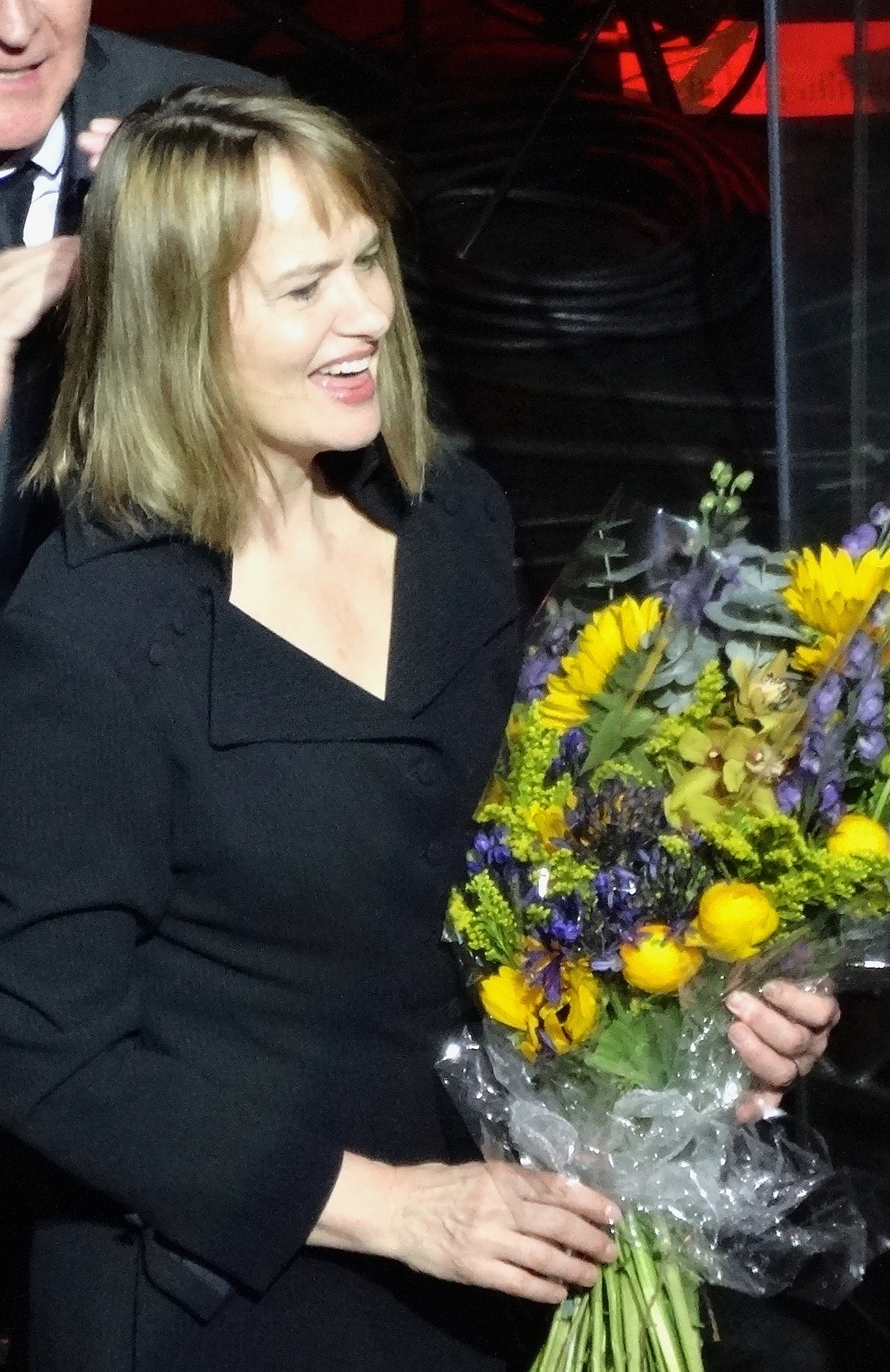
Anne Dudley

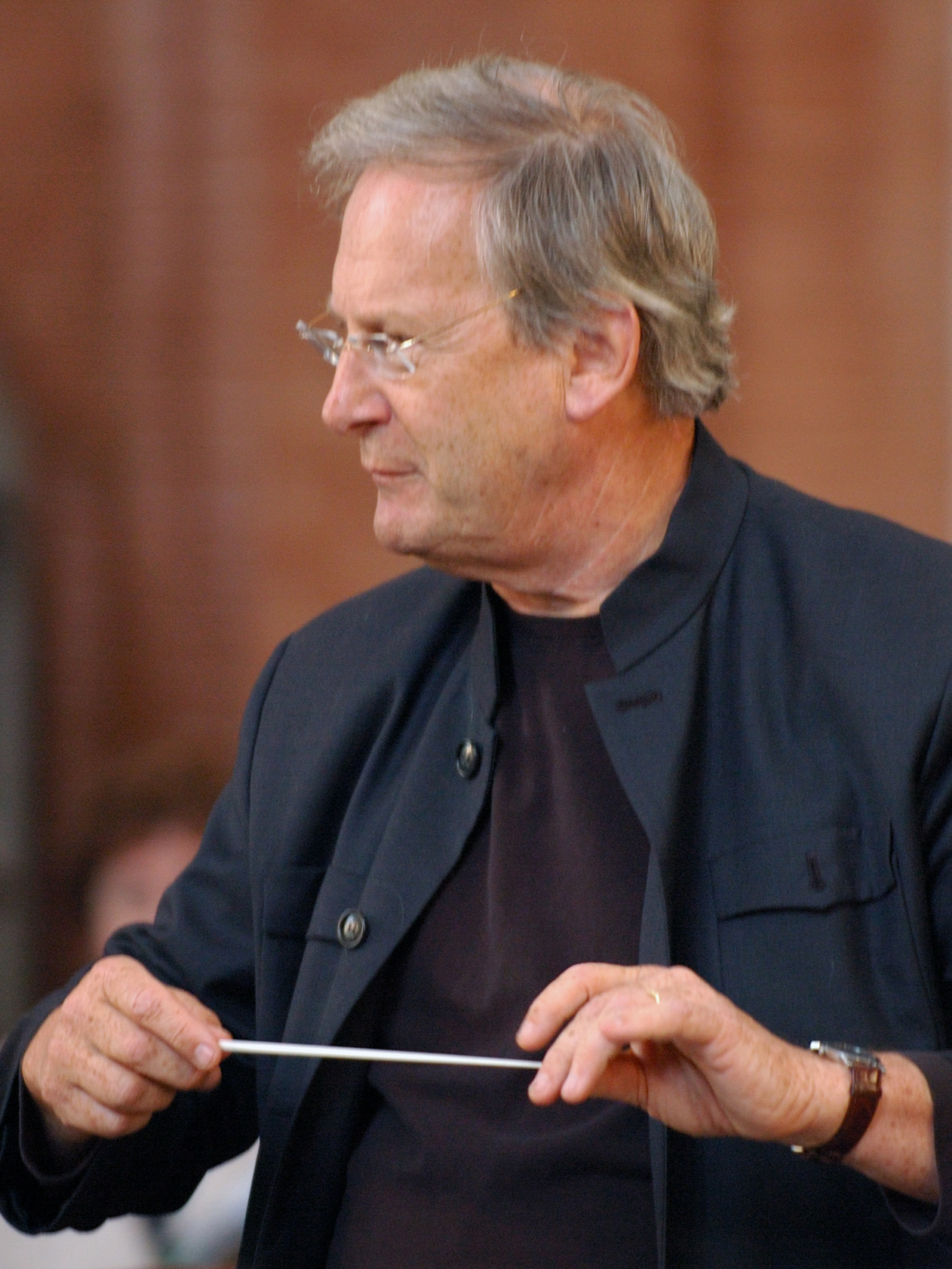
John Eliot Gardiner

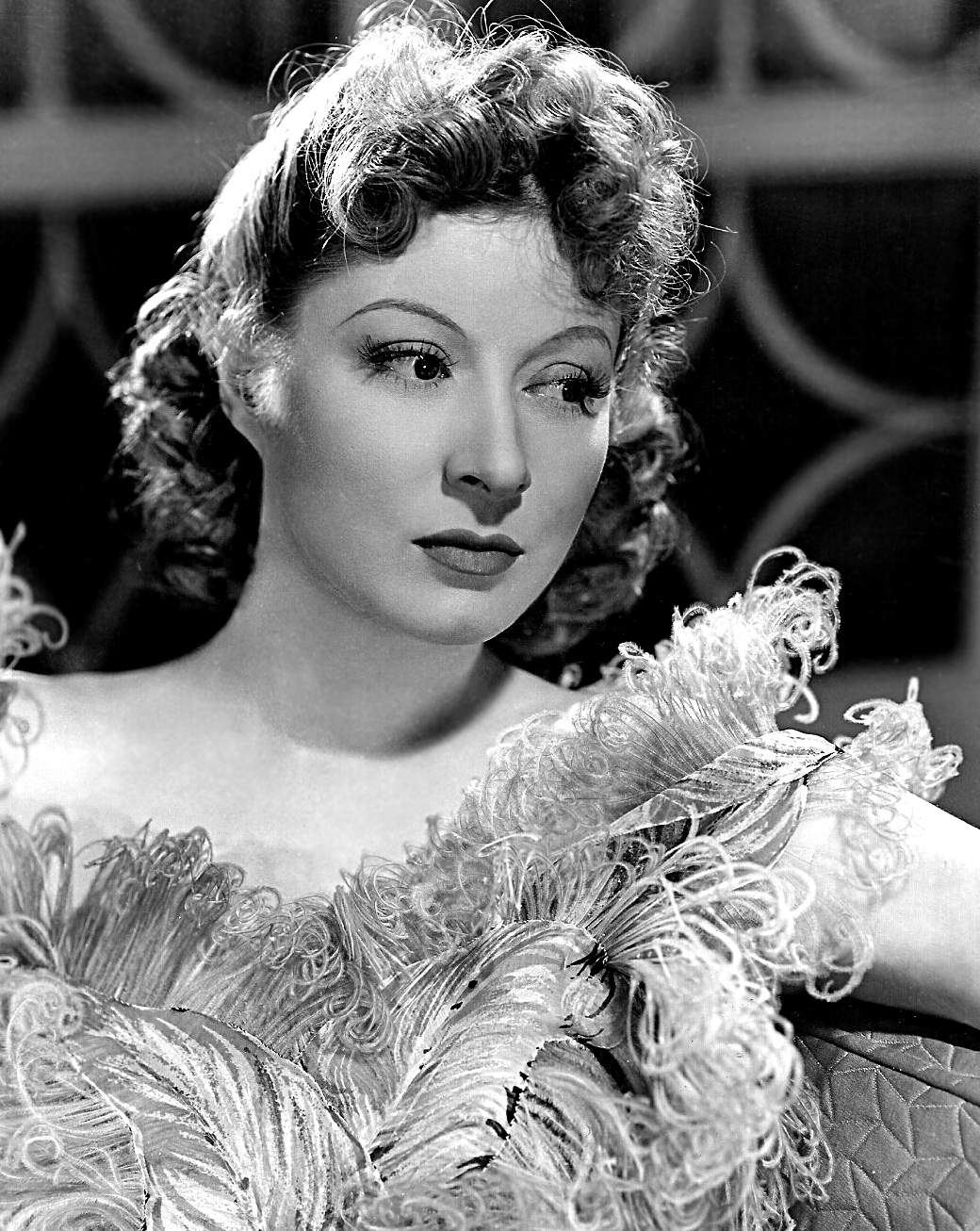
Greer Garson

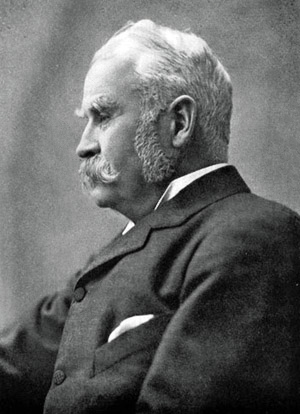
W. S. Gilbert

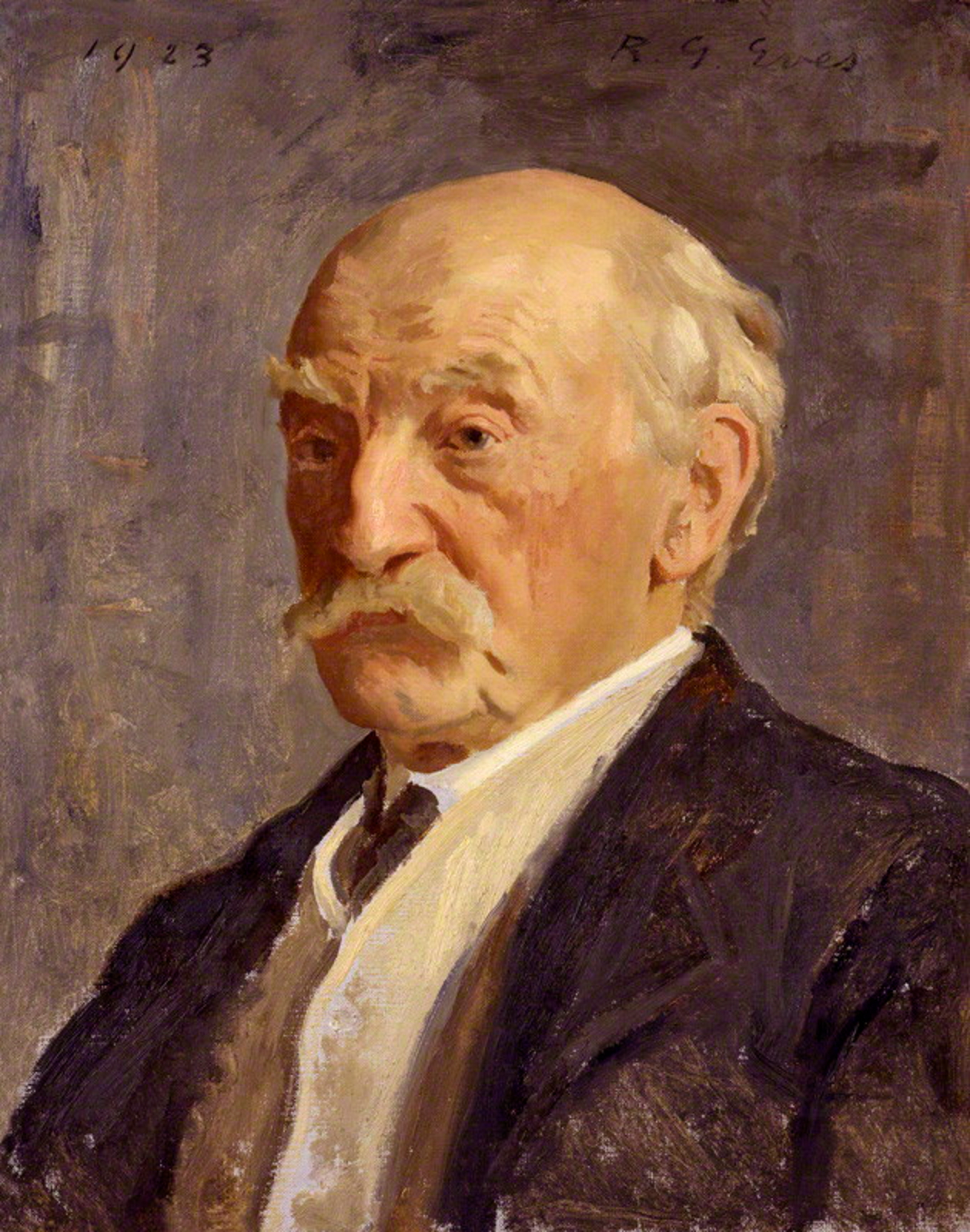
Thomas Hardy

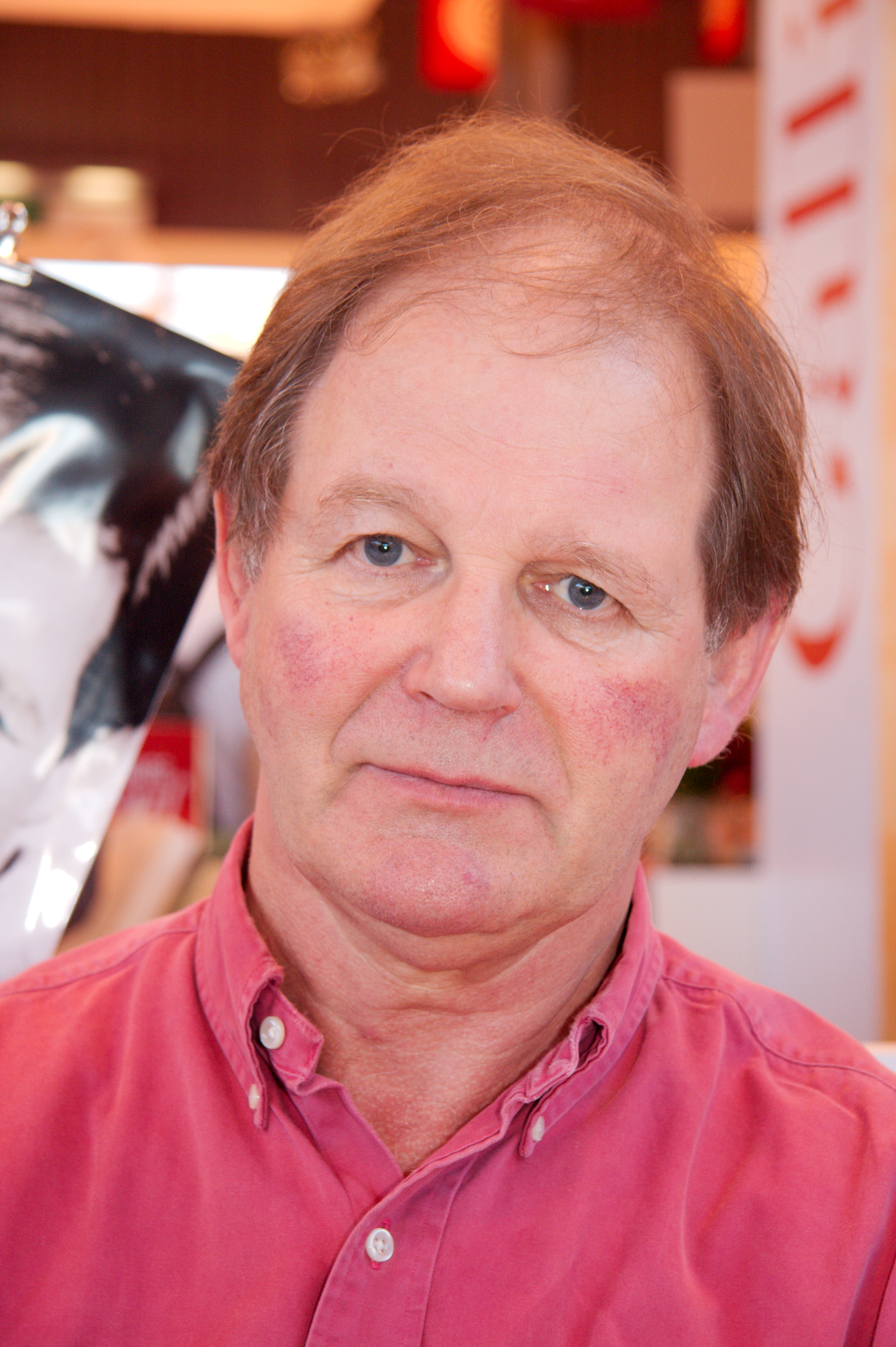
Michael Morpurgo

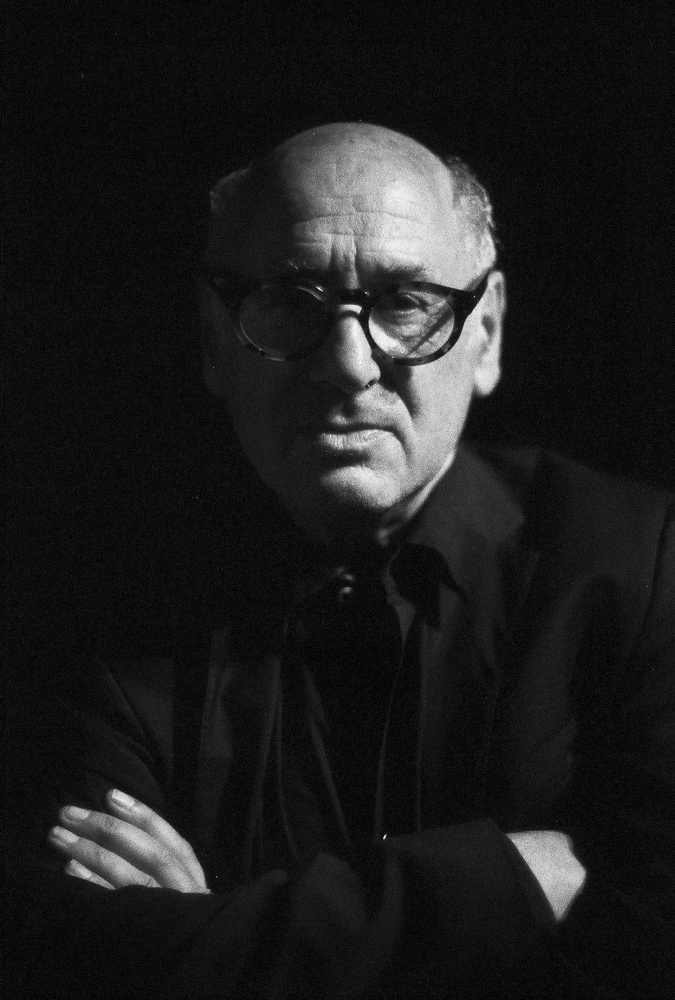
Michael Nyman

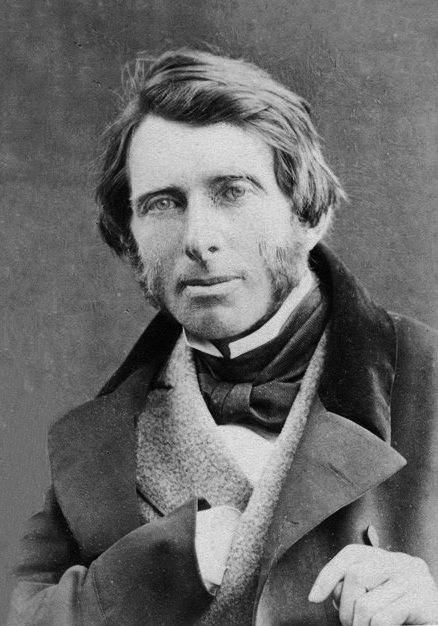
John Ruskin

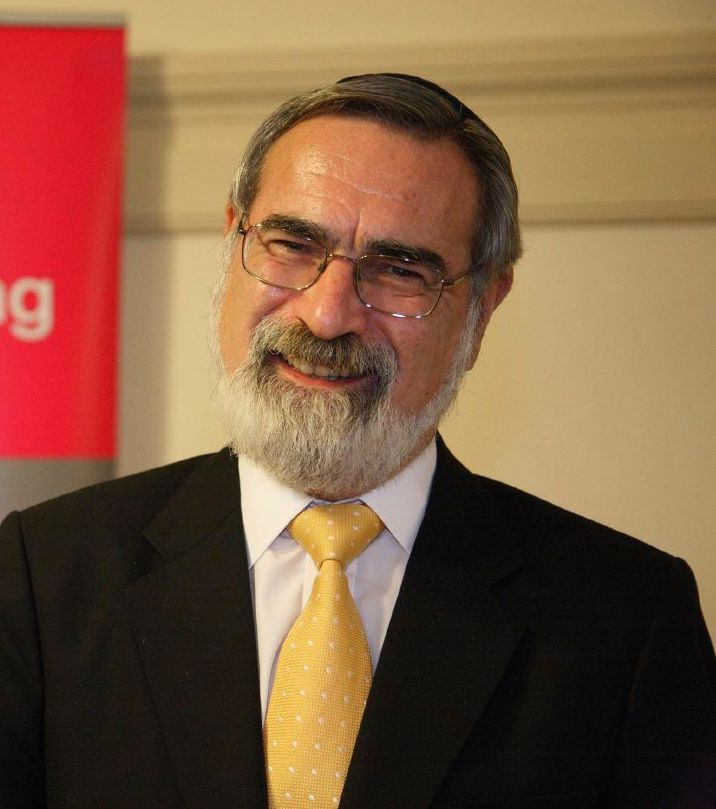
Jonathan Sacks

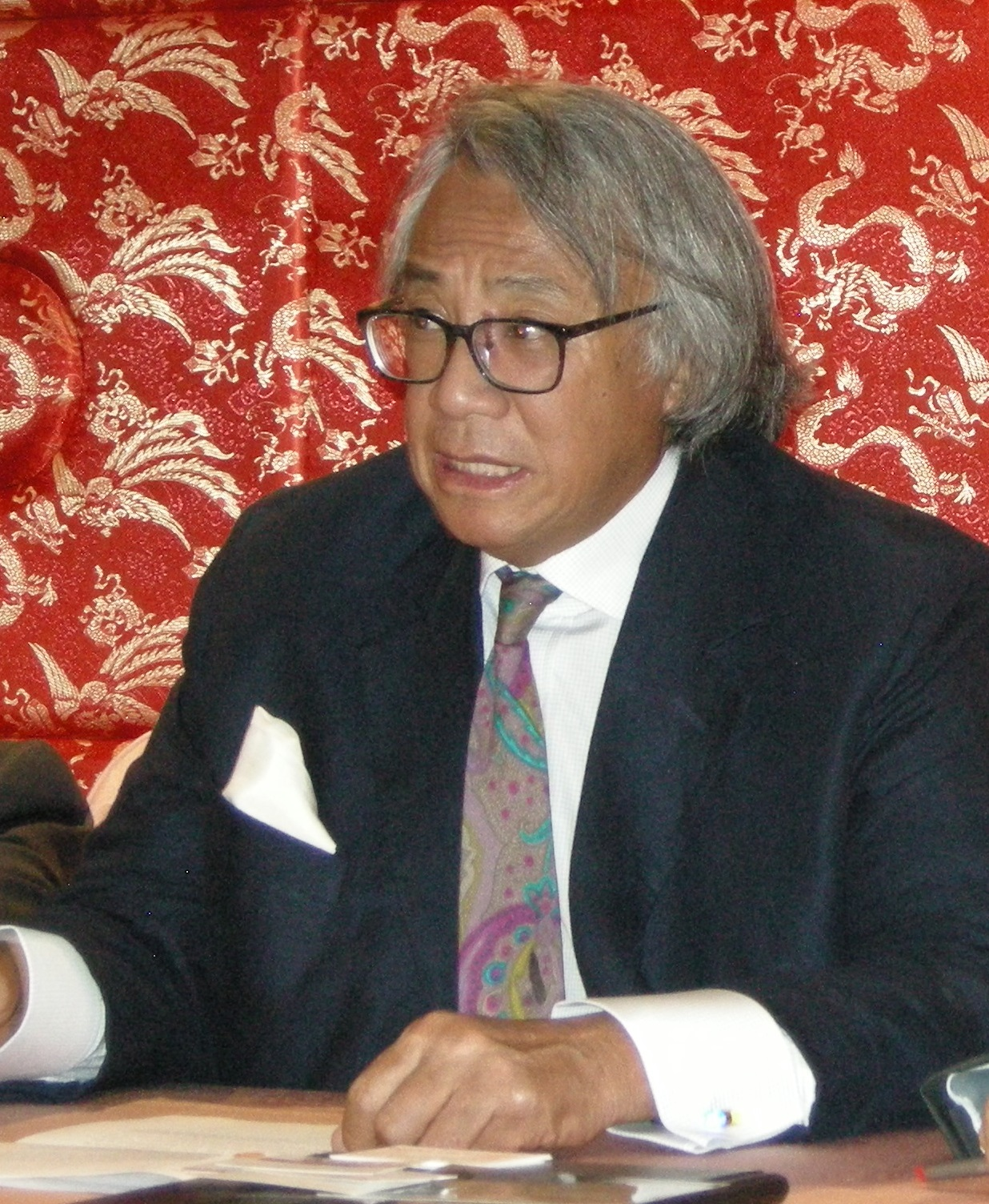
David Tang

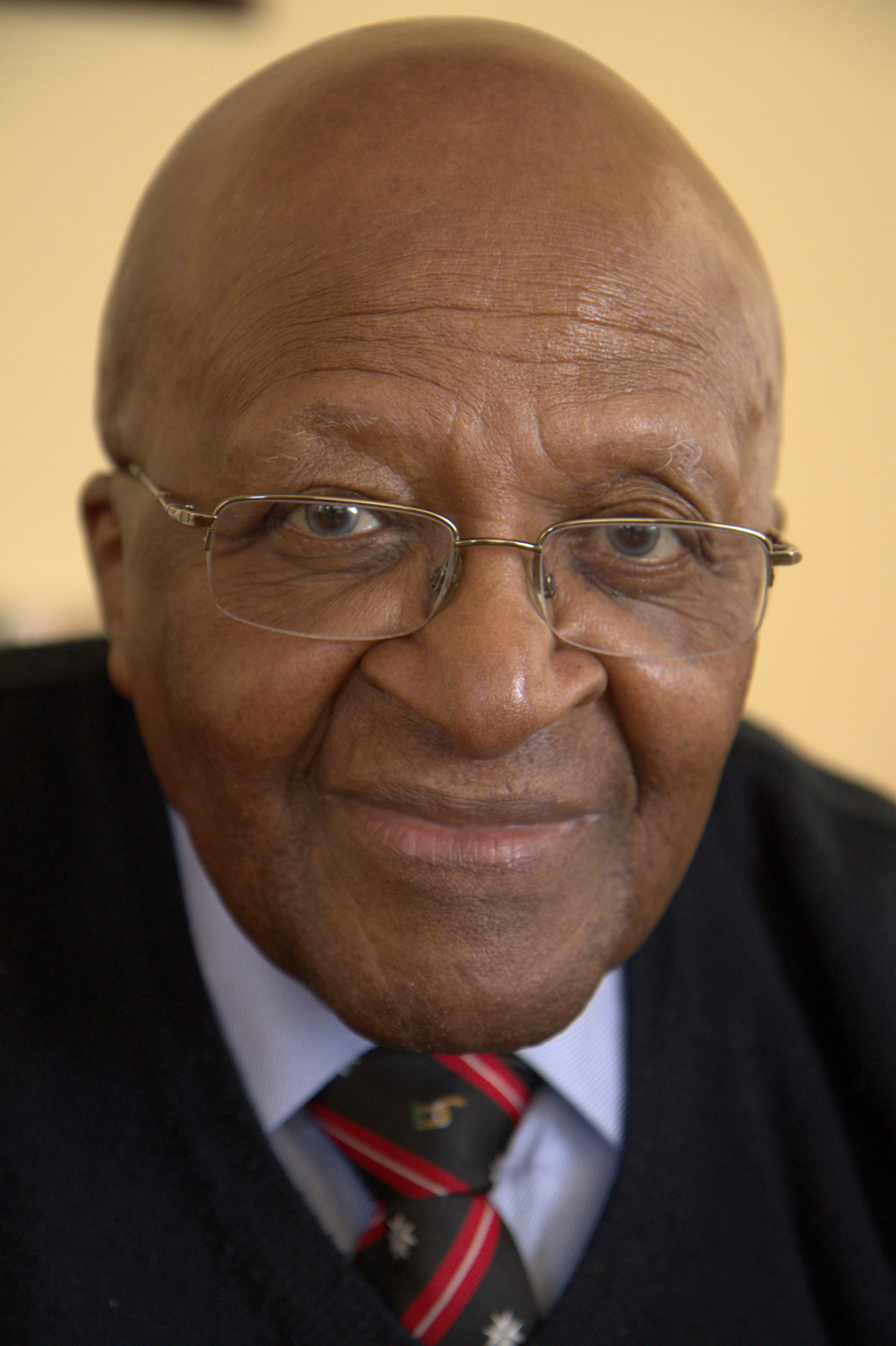
Desmond Tutu

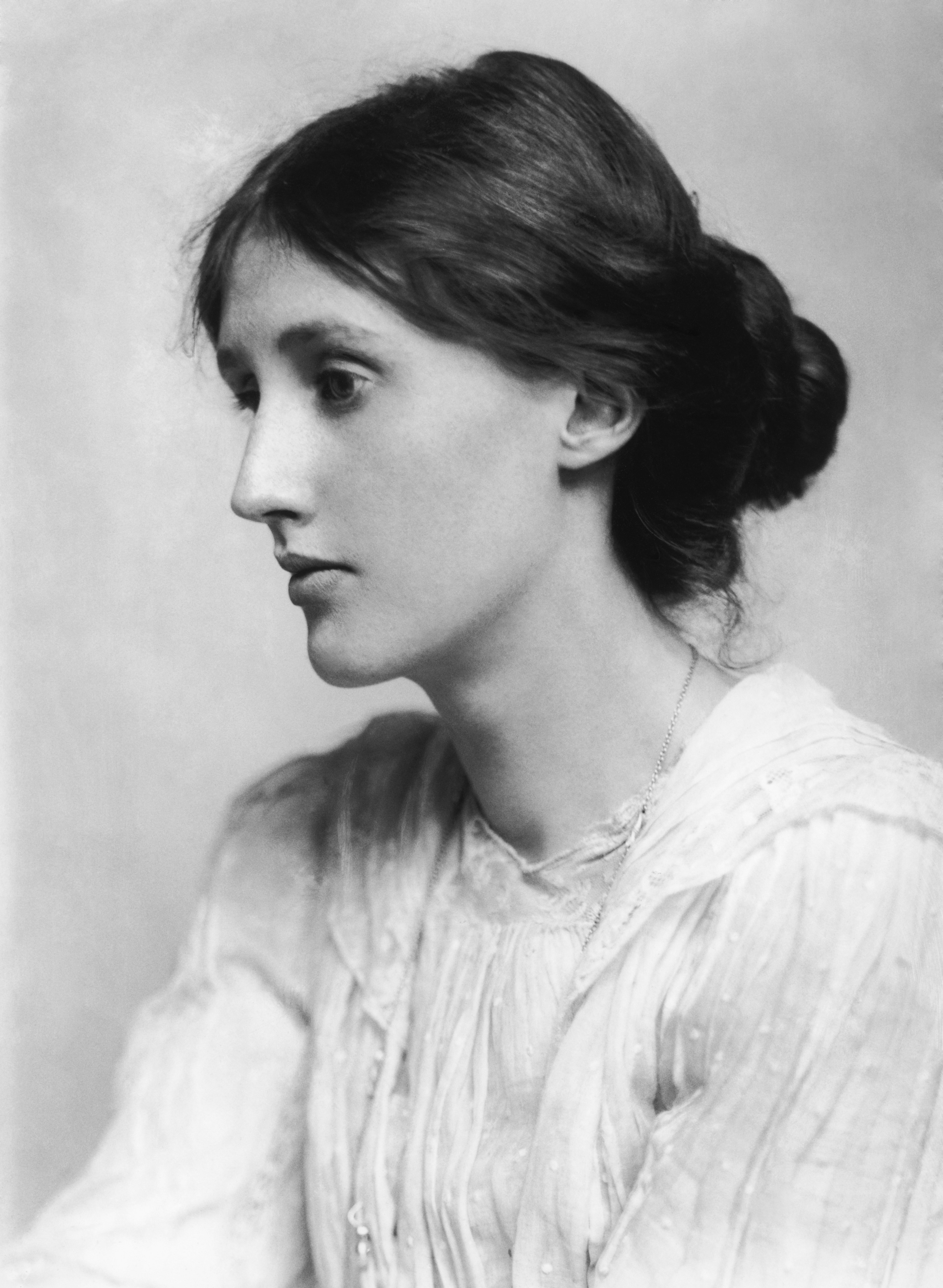
Virginia Woolf
