= Byzantine and Modern Greek Studies =

- Discipline: History
- Language: English
- Edited by: Baukje van den Berg, Eirini Karamouzi

Publication details
- History: 1975–present
- Publisher: Cambridge University Press (United Kingdom)
- Frequency: 2
- Open access: Contains open access

Standard abbreviations
- ISO 4: Byz. Mod. Greek Stud.

Indexing
- ISSN: 0307-0131 (print); 1749-625X (web)
- JSTOR: 03070131

Links
- Journal homepage

Byzantine and Modern Greek Studies (BMGS) is an academic journal which contains articles about Byzantine studies and Modern Greek studies, i.e. the language, literature, history and archaeology of the post-classical Greek world, from late antiquity to the present day, and reviews relevant books. It is published annually, from 1975 to the current day, by Cambridge University Press for the Centre of Byzantine, Ottoman and Modern Greek Studies at the University of Birmingham.

Issued twice a year in spring and autumn, the journal provides a major forum for innovative scholarship on the Greek world in its broader cultural entanglements from late antiquity to the present, expressly including the early modern and Ottoman periods as well as the later reception of Byzantium. Its scope encompasses history, literature, philology, art history, archaeology, and anthropology.

BMGS is committed to publishing original, focused research articles that advance understanding of Byzantine and Modern Greek cultures and societies in their wider regional and global contexts. By bringing together contributions from established and emerging scholars worldwide, the journal promotes intellectual exchange across national and disciplinary boundaries. BMGS welcomes work that crosses disciplinary lines and invites submissions that test new methodologies for approaching the Byzantine and Modern Greek worlds.

The journal was established by Anthony Bryer and Donald Nicol; Nicol was the first editor. The current editors are Baukje van den Berg (Central European University, Vienna), who took over from Ingela Nilsson in 2025, and Eirini Karamouzi (American College of Greece/University of Sheffield), who took over from David Ricks in 2026.
