= Steven Runciman =

British historian of the Middle Ages (1903–2000)

The Honourable Sir Steven Runciman CH FBA
- Runciman in 1957
- Born: James Cochran Stevenson Runciman; 7 July 1903; Northumberland, England
- Died: 1 November 2000 (aged 97); Radway, Warwickshire, England
- Education: Trinity College, Cambridge
- Occupation: Historian
- Known for: A History of the Crusades
- Parent(s): Walter Runciman, 1st Viscount Runciman of Doxford; Hilda Stevenson

Sir James Cochran Stevenson Runciman CH FBA (7 July 1903 – 1 November 2000), known as Steven Runciman, was an English historian best known for his three-volume A History of the Crusades (1951–1954). His works had a profound impact on the popular conception of the Crusades within the Western world, although Runciman considered himself "not a historian, but a writer of literature", and British historian Christopher Tyerman considers Runciman's History to be the "last chronicle of the crusades". Runciman summarized the Crusades as "nothing more than a long act of intolerance in the name of God, which is a sin against the Holy Ghost."

== Biography ==
Born in Northumberland, he was the second son of Walter and Hilda Runciman. His parents were members of the Liberal Party and the first married couple to sit simultaneously in Parliament. His father was created Viscount Runciman of Doxford in 1937. His paternal grandfather, Walter Runciman, 1st Baron Runciman, was a shipping magnate. He was named after his maternal grandfather, James Cochran Stevenson, the MP for South Shields.

=== Eton and Cambridge ===
Runciman said that he started reading Greek at the age of seven or eight. Later he came to be able to make use of sources in other languages as well: Arabic, Turkish, Persian, Hebrew, Syriac, Armenian and Georgian. A King's Scholar at Eton College, he was an exact contemporary and close friend of George Orwell. While there, they both studied French under Aldous Huxley.

In 1921 he entered Trinity College, Cambridge, as a history scholar and studied under J. B. Bury, becoming, as Runciman later said, falsely, "his first, and only, student". At first the reclusive Bury tried to brush him off; then, when Runciman mentioned that he could read Russian, Bury gave him a stack of Bulgarian articles to edit, and so their relationship began. His work on the Byzantine Empire earned him a fellowship at Trinity in 1927.

=== Historian ===
After receiving a large inheritance from his grandfather, Runciman resigned his fellowship in 1938 and began travelling widely. Thus, for much of his life he was an independent scholar, living on private means. He went on to be a press attaché at the British Legation in the Bulgarian capital, Sofia, in 1940 and at the British Embassy in Cairo in 1941. From 1942 to 1945 he was Professor of Byzantine Art and History at Istanbul University, in Turkey, where he began the research on the Crusades which would lead to his best known work, the History of the Crusades (three volumes appearing in 1951, 1952 and 1954). From 1945 to 1947 he was a representative in Athens of the British Council.

Most of Runciman's historical works deal with Byzantium and her medieval neighbours between Sicily and Syria; one exception is The White Rajahs, published in 1960, which tells the story of Sarawak, an independent state founded on the northern coast of Borneo in 1841 by James Brooke, and ruled by the Brooke family for more than a century.

Jonathan Riley-Smith, one of the leading historians of the Crusades of the subsequent generation, was told by Runciman during an on-camera interview that he [Runciman] considered himself "not a historian, but a writer of literature." According to Christopher Tyerman, Professor of the History of the Crusades at Hertford College, Oxford, Runciman created a work that "across the Anglophone world continues as a base reference for popular attitudes, evident in print, film, television and on the internet."

=== Occult ===
In his personal life, Runciman was an old-fashioned English eccentric, known as an æsthete, raconteur, and enthusiast of the occult. According to Andrew Robinson, a history teacher at Eton, "he played piano duets with the last Emperor of China, told tarot cards for King Fuad of Egypt, narrowly missed being blown up by the Germans in the Pera Palace Hotel in Istanbul and twice hit the jackpot on slot machines in Las Vegas". A story from his time at Eton of an incident with a then-friend, Eric Blair, who later became famous writing as George Orwell, is told in Gordon Bowker's biography of Orwell: "Drawing from new correspondence with Steven Runciman, one of Orwell's friends at Eton (which he attended from 1917 to 1921), Bowker reveals the (perhaps surprising) fascination of Blair with the occult. A senior boy, Phillip Yorke, had attracted the disfavour of both Blair and Runciman so they planned a revenge. As Runciman recalled, they fashioned an image of Yorke from candle wax and broke off a leg. To their horror, shortly afterwards, Yorke not only broke his leg but in July died of leukaemia. The story of what happened soon spread and, in somewhat garbled form, became legend. Blair and Runciman suddenly found themselves regarded as distinctly odd, and to be treated warily".

=== Homosexuality ===
Runciman was homosexual. There is little evidence of a long-term lover, but Runciman boasted of a number of casual sexual encounters, and told a friend in later life: "I have the temperament of a harlot, and so am free of emotional complications." Nevertheless, Runciman was discreet about his homosexuality, partly perhaps because of religious feelings that homosexuality was "an inarguable offence against God". Runciman also felt that his sexuality had potentially held back his career. Max Mallowan related a conversation in which Runciman told him "that he felt his life had been a failure because of his gayness".

=== Death ===
He died in Radway, Warwickshire, while visiting relatives, aged 97. He never married.

== Assessment ==
Edward Peters (2011) says Runciman's three-volume narrative history of the Crusades "instantly became the most widely known and respected single-author survey of the subject in English".

John M. Riddle (2008) says that for the greater part of the twentieth century Runciman was the "greatest historian of the Crusades". He reports that "Prior to Runciman, in the early part of the century, historians related the Crusades as an idealistic attempt of Christendom to push Islam back." Runciman regarded the Crusades "as a barbarian invasion of a superior civilization, not that of the Muslims but of the Byzantines".

Thomas F. Madden (2005) stresses the impact of Runciman's style and viewpoint:

It is no exaggeration to say that Runciman single-handedly crafted the current popular concept of the crusades. The reasons for this are twofold. First, he was a learned man with a solid grasp of the chronicle sources. Second, and perhaps more important, he wrote beautifully. The picture of the crusades that Runciman painted owed much to current scholarship yet much more to Sir Walter Scott. Throughout his history Runciman portrayed the crusaders as simpletons or barbarians seeking salvation through the destruction of the sophisticated cultures of the east. In his famous "summing-up" of the crusades he concluded that "the Holy War in itself was nothing more than a long act of intolerance in the name of God, which is a sin against the Holy Ghost.

Mark K. Vaughn (2007) says that "Runciman's three-volume History of the Crusades remains the primary standard of comparison." However, Vaughn also says that Tyerman "accurately, if perhaps with a bit of hubris, notes that Runciman's work is now outdated and seriously flawed". Tyerman himself has said: "It would be folly and hubris to pretend to compete, to match, as it were, my clunking computer keyboard with his [Runciman's] pen, at once a rapier and a paintbrush; to pit one volume, however substantial, with the breadth, scope and elegance of his three."

== Honours ==
- Runciman was knighted in the 1958 New Year Honours List and appointed a Member of the Order of the Companions of Honour in 1984. He was elected a Fellow of the British Academy in 1957 and a member of the American Philosophical Society in 1965.
- Streets in Mystras, Greece, and Sofia, Bulgaria, were named in his honour.

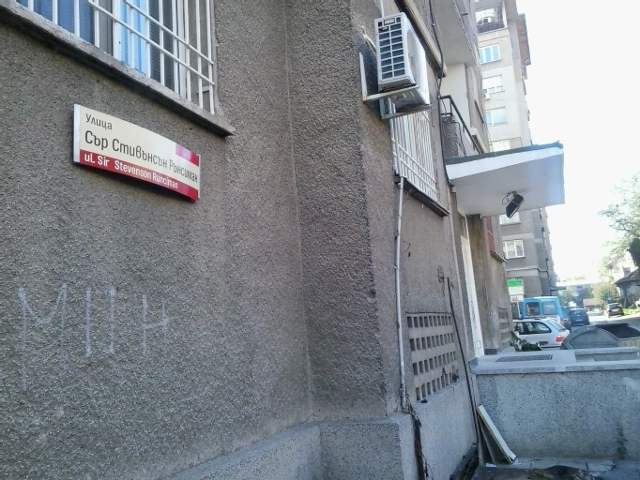
Sir Stevenson Runciman Street in Sofia, Bulgaria

- In 1991, the Czech painter and philhellene Nicholas Egon established the annual Runciman Lectures at King's College London in honour of Runciman.

== Works ==
Published works of Runciman include the following.

- The Emperor Romanus Lecapenus and His Reign: A Study of Tenth-Century Byzantium (1929)
- A History of the First Bulgarian Empire. London. 1930 – via Internet Archive.
- Byzantine Civilization (1933)
- The Medieval Manichee: A Study of the Christian Dualist Heresy (1947)
- A History of the Crusades, Volume One: The First Crusade and the Foundation of the Kingdom of Jerusalem (1951)
- A History of the Crusades, Volume Two: The Kingdom of Jerusalem and the Frankish East, 1100-1187 (1952)
- A History of the Crusades, Volume Three: The Kingdom of Acre and the Later Crusades (1954)
- The Eastern Schism: A Study of the Papacy and the Eastern Churches during the XIth and XIIth Centuries (1955)
- The Sicilian Vespers: A History of the Mediterranean World in the Later Thirteenth Century (1958)
- The White Rajahs: A History of Sarawak from 1841 to 1946 (1960)
- The Fall of Constantinople 1453 (1965)
- The Great Church in Captivity: A Study of the Patriarchate of Constantinople from the Eve of the Turkish Conquest to the Greek War of Independence (1968)
- The Last Byzantine Renaissance (1970) ISBN 9780521097109
- The Orthodox Churches and the Secular State (1971) ISBN 9780196476131
- Byzantine Style and Civilization (1975) ISBN 9780140137545
- The Byzantine Theocracy: The Weil Lectures, Cincinnati (1977) ISBN 9780521545914
- Mistra: Byzantine Capital of the Peloponnese (1980) ISBN 9780500250716
- The First Crusade (1980) ISBN 9780521232555
- A Traveller's Alphabet: Partial Memoirs (1991) ISBN 9780500015049

=== Selected papers ===
- ———— (1974). "The Empress Irene". In Hoover, Dwight W.; Koumoulides, John T. A. (eds.). Focus on Biography. Conspectus of History. Vol. 1/#1. Muncie, Indiana: Ball State University. pp. 1–11. Archived from the original on 6 May 2021.
- ———— (1977). "Balkan Cities — Yesterday and Today". In Hoover, Dwight W.; Koumoulides, John T. A. (eds.). Cities in History. Conspectus of History. Vol. 1/#4. Muncie, Indiana: Ball State University. pp. 1–12. Archived from the original on 14 May 2021.
