= Geoffrey B. Waywell =

British archaeologist (1944–2016)

Professor Geoffrey B. Waywell FSA
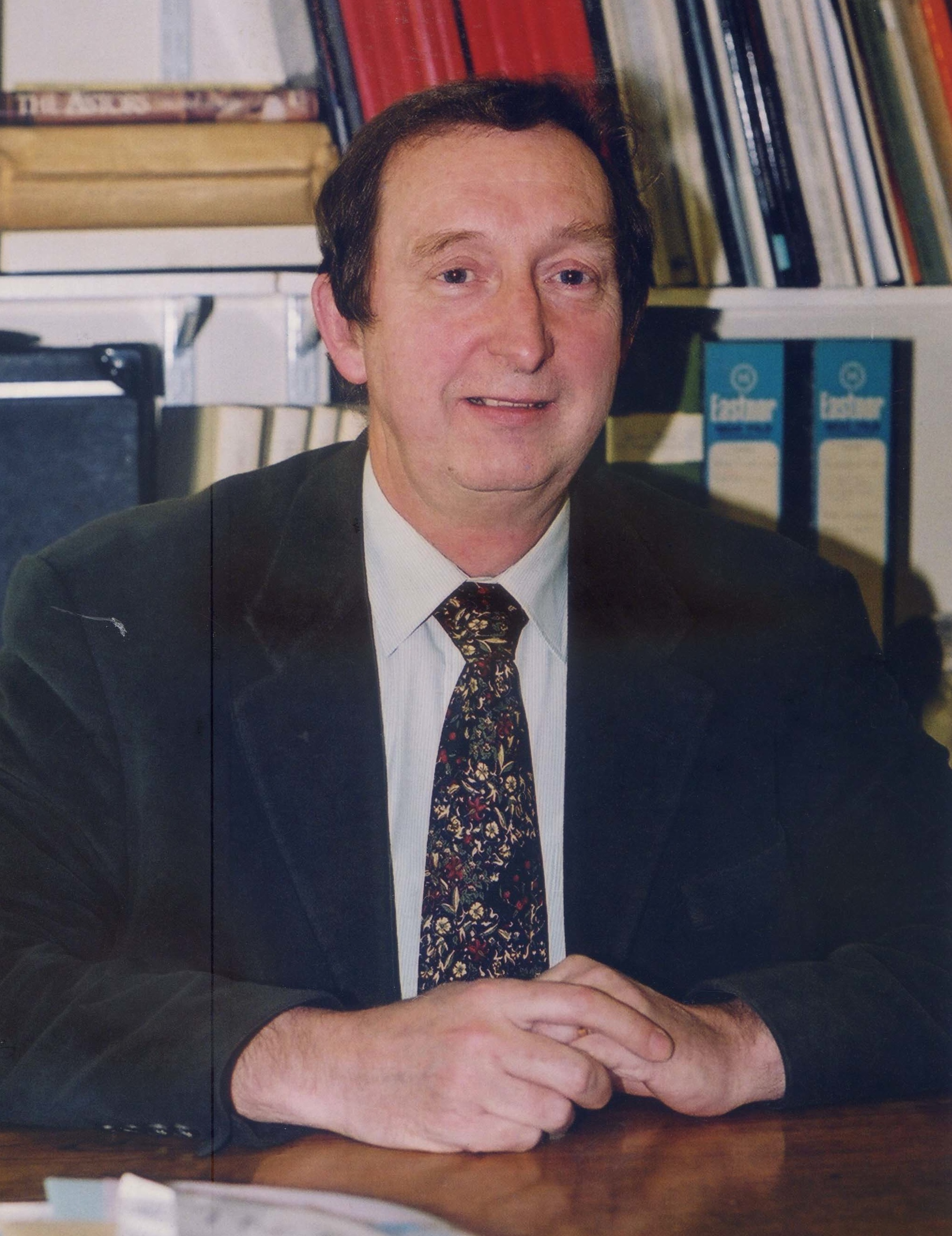
- Waywell at King's College London in 1998
- Born: 16 January 1944
- Died: 16 February 2016 (aged 72)
- Occupation: Professor of Classical Archaeology

Academic background
- Education: PhD Classics
- Alma mater: University of Cambridge
- Thesis: Landscape Elements in Greek Relief Sculpture (1969)

Academic work
- Discipline: Classics
- Sub-discipline: Classical Archaeology, Greek and Roman Sculpture
- Institutions: British School at Athens, King's College London, Institute of Classical Studies

Geoffrey B. Waywell FSA (16 January 1944 – 16 February 2016) was a British archaeologist who served as Professor of Classical Archaeology at King's College London, Director of the Institute of Classical Studies, University of London, and a specialist in Greek and Roman sculpture.

== Academic career ==
Professor Geoffrey Waywell was educated in the University of Cambridge, where he received his PhD in 1969 for a dissertation on “Landscape Elements in Greek Relief Sculpture”. After graduating, he spent some time researching and excavating at the British School at Athens. He then returned to the UK and for 36 years taught at King's College London where he had joined the Department of Classics in 1968 as Lecturer in Classical Archaeology. He was made Professor of Classical Archaeology in 1987, and acted as Head of department in 1989–1993. In 1996 he was appointed Director of the Institute of Classical Studies, and while continuing to teach at King's, stage-managed the move of the Institute and the Combined Library from Gordon Square to Senate House. He retired from the ICS and King's in 2004, and was elected a Fellow of King's College in that year.

== Key bibliography ==
=== Monographs ===
- The Free-standing Sculptures of the Mausoleum of Halicarnassus in the British Museum: A Catalogue (London 1978).
- G. B. Waywell and I. Jenkins (eds.), Sculptors and Sculpture of Caria and the Dodecanese (London 1997).
- The Lever and Hope Sculptures: Ancient Sculptures in the Lady Lever Art Gallery, Port Sunlight, and a Catalogue of the Ancient Sculptures Formerly in the Hope Collection (Berlin 1986).
- Pheidias: the Sculptures and Ancient Sources, Bulletin of the Institute of Classical Studies Supplement 105 (London 2009).

=== Articles ===
- "A four-horse chariot relief of the fifth century BC," Annual of the British School at Athens 62 (1967), pp. 19–26.
- "Some relief sculptures in the Museum of the British School at Athens," Annual of the British School at Athens 65 (1970), pp. 271–275.
- "Chapter IV: the sculpture," in J. N. Coldstream (ed.), Knossos, the Sanctuary of Demeter (London 1973) pp. 93–98.
- "A Roman portrait bust from Knossos," Annual of the British School at Athens 68 (1973), pp. 295–296.
- "A find of Roman statuettes at Knossos,” (with H. Catling), Annual of the British School at Athens 72 (1977), pp. 85–106.
- "Roman plaster sculptures," in L. H. Sackett and J. E. Jones (eds.), Knossos: from Greek City to Roman Colony (Oxford 1992), pp. 333–350.
- "The treatment of landscape elements in the sculptures of the Parthenon," in Parthenon-Congress Basel (Mainz 1984), pp. 312–316.
- “New discoveries at the ancient theatre of Sparta,” in M. Stamatopoulou and M. Yeroulanou (eds.), Excavating Classical Culture (Oxford 2002), pp. 245–253.
