= Androna =

Archaeological site in Aleppo Governorate, Syria

- الأندرين (Arabic)
- Al-Andarin
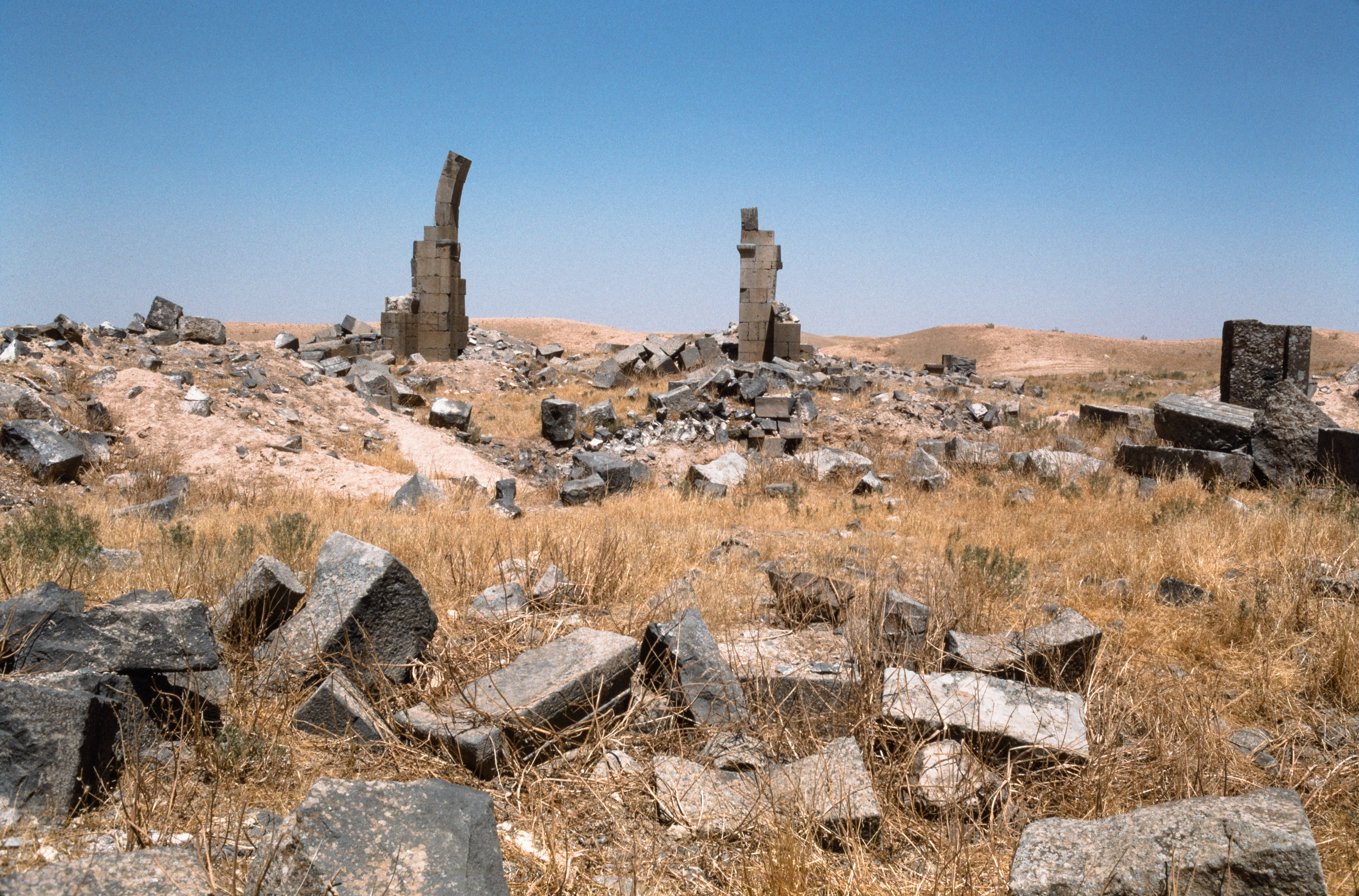
- Remains of a large church from west of Androna

- Location within Syria
- 35.533248°N 37.360827°E
- Location: Syria
- Region: Aleppo Governorate

Site notes
- Excavation dates: 1905 – ongoing
- Archaeologists: H.C. Butler (1905); R. Mouterde, A. Poidebard (1930); Marges Arides; Syrian Department of Antiquities director Dr. R. Ugdeh; University of Heidelberg director Prof. C. Strube; University of Oxford director Dr. Marlia Mango

Androna, also known as al-Andarin (Arabic: الأندرين), is a Byzantine site spread over a vast area at the edges of the semi-desert, about 25 kilometers beyond the more well-known Byzantine site of Qasr Ibn Wardan.

== History ==
Androna was built as a defense line against nomadic skirmishes in the Syrian Desert. The fortified city contains at least ten churches, a large military building and public baths; and was famous for its vineyards and high-quality wine in which it was mentioned by Amr ibn Kulthum in his ode.

The following is the opening verse of his ode:

أَلاَ هُبِّي بِصَحْنِكِ فَاصْبَحِيْنَـا وَلاَ تُبْقِي خُمُـوْرَ الأَنْدَرِيْنَـا

Translation:

Ha girl! Up with the bowl! Give us our dawn draught
And do not spare the wines of al-Andarina

== Bibliography ==
- Strube, Christine (2015). al Andarin, das antike Androna. Oberflächenbefunde und Grabungsergebnisse: die beiden Umfassungsmauern und das Kastron [al Andarin, ancient Androna. Surface findings and excavation results: the two enclosure walls and the kastron]. Mainz: RGZM, ISBN 978-3-88467-234-1.
