= Marlia Mango =

British archaeologist and historian of Byzantium

Marlia Mundell Mango (born 1950) is a Byzantine archaeologist and historian at the University of Oxford, where she was University Lecturer in Byzantine Archaeology and Art (1995–2008).

== Biography ==
Mango graduated with a BA from Newton College of the Sacred Heart in Massachusetts in 1964. Subsequently, Mango was a curator and archaeologist at the research library of Dumbarton Oaks.

In 1985, Mango was awarded a DPhil from the University of Oxford on the subject of 'Artistic patronage in the Roman diocese of Oriens, 313–641 AD’, supervised by Martin Harrison.

Mango is currently the Director of Excavations for the Byzantine site of Androna in modern Syria, and an emeritus research fellow at St John's College, Oxford.

Her husband was Cyril Mango and she worked with him on St Catherine's Monastery at Mount Sinai.

== Honours ==
Mango's 1986 monograph Silver from Early Byzantium. The Kaper Koraon and Related Treasures was awarded the Prix Gustave Schlumberger (Académie des Inscriptions et Belles-Lettres, Institut de France). In 1999, Mango was awarded the Frend Medal by the Society of Antiquaries of London. In 2017, a festchrift was published in honour of Mango, entitled Discipuli dona ferentes: Glimpses of Byzantium in Honour of Marlia Mundell Mango, containing contributions on Byzantine art and archaeology.

== Works ==
- The churches and monasteries of the Ṭur ʻAbdin (1982)
- Silver from early Byzantium (1986)
- The Sevso Treasure (1994)
- Byzantine trade, 4th–12th centuries (2004)
