= Anglo-Hellenic League =

The Anglo-Hellenic League was founded in the aftermath of the 1912–13 Balkan Wars in order to counter anti-Greek propaganda in the United Kingdom. Dedicated to promoting Anglo-Greek understanding and friendship, the League has a long history of charitable and cultural work. After the First World War, through John Gennadius, a co-founder and Honorary President, the League took a leading role in establishing the Koraes Chair of Modern Greek and Byzantine History, Language and Literature at King's College London. During the Second World War the League raised funds for the starving Greek population and for the Greek Navy and the Merchant Marine. In the immediate post-war years the League gave assistance to a children's home, a hospital in Athens and to war-ravaged villages in remote parts of Greece and gave similar help to the southern Ionian Islands after the 1953 Ionian earthquake. In 1979/80 the League raised over £80,000 towards the 'Save the Acropolis' Appeal.

It is an organisation supporting and promoting Anglo-Greek relations and understanding. In 1990 it published a biannual magazine The Anglo-Hellenic Review. This publication ceased in autumn of 2014 after 50 issues.

It is a member society of the Hellenic Centre, and since the mid-1990s it is housed at the Hellenic Centre in London.

From 1986, the league awards annually the Runciman Award (named in honor of the writer and historian Steven Runciman) for books published in English and relating to Greece and Hellenism.

== Bibliography ==
- ΑΙΜ 25, King's College London College Archives
- Information about the League from the site of Prince Michael of Kent - President and Chief Patron of the League retrieved 10 June 2007
- Database of Archive of Non-Governmental Organisations, record for Anglo-Hellenic League
