= Ingela Nilsson =

Academic, hellenist, classical philologist, Byzantinist (1970-)

Ingela Nilsson is a Professor of Greek at Uppsala University in Sweden, specializing in Byzantine literature and narratology.

== Career ==
In 2001, Nilsson received her Ph.D. at the University of Gothenburg. She was a postdoctoral researcher at the Freie Universität Berlin 2002–04, and started working as an assistant professor at Uppsala University in 2004. In 2006–2010, she was a Pro futura fellow at the Swedish Collegium for Advanced Study, and in 2007 she became an Associate Professor there.

In 2010, she became a Professor of Greek at Uppsala University. From 2016 to 2017, she was also an adjunct professor at the University of Oslo in the Department of Philosophy, Classics, History of Art and Ideas. Since the beginning of 2019, she has been the director of the Swedish Research Institute in Istanbul, a position she will hold until the end of 2021.

Nilsson was the editor of the journal Byzantine and Modern Greek Studies until 2025.

== Research ==
Nilsson's fields of scholarship include Greek literature, Byzantine literature, and narratology. Her research focuses on the “links between ancient and Byzantine literature as considered from narratological and transtextual points of view (especially in the twelfth century), the relation between word and image in Byzantium, historiographical writing and fictional strategies, and the image of Byzantium in post-Byzantine Europe.” In 2020, a research group led by Nilsson received funding for an eight-year project investigating narratives in several 11th-century cultures. In 2021, she stated that her research has concerned "primarily ancient paradoxography and medieval romances.”

== Awards ==
- 2002 - 2003 Postdoctoral fellowship from Wenner-Gren Foundations: Freie Universität Berlin
- 2003 - 2004 Postdoctoral fellowship from Alexander von Humboldt Stiftung: Freie Universität Berlin
- 2006 - 2010 Pro Futura II Fellow, Swedish Collegium for Advanced Study and Riksbankens Jubileumsfond
- 2008 - 2009 Grant from STINT: visiting researcher at Centre d’études Byzantines, École des Hautes Études en Sciences Sociales, Paris
- 2014 Grant from Hilda Kumlins stiftelse: visiting researcher at Österreichische Akademie der Wissenschaften, Vienna

== Books ==
- Satire in the Middle Byzantine Period: The Golden Age of Laughter (Leiden: Brill, 2021)
- Writer and Occasion in Twelfth-Century Byzantium. Cambridge University Press, 2020. ISBN 9781108910217
- Reading the Late Byzantine Romance. Cambridge University press, 2018. ISBN 9781108163767
- Raconter Byzance: la littérature au XIIe siècle (Paris: Belles Lettres, 2014)
- Plotting with Eros : essays on the poetics of love and the erotics of reading (Copenhagen: Museum Tusculanum Press, 2009)
