= Cyril Mango =

British scholar (1928–2021)

Cyril Mango FBA, FSA
- Born: 14 April 1928; Istanbul, Turkey
- Died: 8 February 2021 (aged 92); United Kingdom

Academic background
- Education: English High School for Boys
- Alma mater: University of St Andrews (1949); Sorbonne (1953)
- Thesis: Recherches sur le palais impérial de Constantinople : la Chalcé et ses abords (1953)
- Doctoral advisor: Rodolphe Guilland

Academic work
- Institutions: Dumbarton Oaks (1951–63, 1968–73); King's College London (1963–68); University of Oxford (1973–95)
- Doctoral students: John Wortley
- Notable works: Byzantium: The Empire of New Rome

Cyril Alexander Mango FBA, FSA (14 April 1928 – 8 February 2021) was a British scholar of the history, art, and architecture of the Byzantine Empire. He is celebrated as one of the leading Byzantinists of the 20th century.

Mango was Koraes Professor of Modern Greek and Byzantine History, Language and Literature at King's College London, the University of Oxford Bywater and Sotheby Professor Emeritus of Byzantine and Modern Greek Language and Literature and emeritus professorial fellow of Exeter College, Oxford.

== Early life and education ==
Mango was born on 14 April 1928 in Istanbul, Turkey, the youngest of three sons of Alexander A. Mango, a descendant of a Genoese family who came to Istanbul via Chios, and Adelaide, known as Ada, (née Damonov) Mango, a refugee from Baku. One of his brothers, Andrew Mango, who lived and worked in London becoming head of the South East European Service of the BBC World Service, was also a respected scholar and author on Turkey. His other brother, Anthony, moved to America and became a senior figure in the United Nations. They were raised in a multi-lingual household where the common language was French but the children also spoke Russian, Greek, English and Turkish. Cyril Mango was also fluent in Spanish and Italian.

After being schooled at the English High School for Boys in Istanbul, where his father, who became a British citizen after studying law in England, was a barrister and legal counsel to the British ambassador, he graduated from the University of St Andrews with an M.A. in classical philology in 1949. He went on to study at the University of Paris, leaving the Sorbonne with a doctorate in history in 1953.

== Career ==
- Harvard University, Dumbarton Oaks, Washington, D.C., Junior Fellow (1951–1953), Fellow (1953–1954), and Research Associate (1954–1955) of Byzantine Studies, Instructor in Byzantine Archaeology (1955–1958), Lecturer in Byzantine Archaeology (1958–1962), Associate Professor of Byzantine Archaeology (1962–1963), Executive Editor of Dumbarton Oaks Publications (1958–1963), member of the Board of Scholars for Byzantine Studies (1967–1972), and member of the research staff (1972–1973)
- University of London, King's College, London, England, Koraes Professor of Modern Greek and Byzantine History, Language and Literature, 1963–68
- Oxford University, Oxford, England, Bywater and Sotheby Professor of Byzantine and Modern Greek Language and Literature, 1973–95
- Visiting associate professor of Byzantine history, University of California, Berkeley, 1960–61
- Fellow of the Society of Antiquaries of London
- Fellow of the British Academy, elected 1976
- Member of the American Academy of Arts and Sciences, elected 1992

Cyril Mango’s archaeological and academic work (excavation, publications, edited volumes, translations, lectures) on Byzantine culture was extensive. His first major book, The Brazen House. A Study of the Vestibule of the Imperial Palace of Constantinople was published in 1959 and remains a classic. One of his other major works, The Mosaics of St. Sophia at Istanbul (1962), details the history of the mosaics of the Hagia Sophia and is still considered an important work. He also edited The Oxford History of Byzantium (2002), often recommended as the best introduction to the subject. At the time of his death, he was overseeing the final details of a major book on Constantinople ahead of its publication.

As a sign of respect, the flag at Exeter College, Oxford was flown at half-mast in the week of Professor Mango’s death.

== Other ==
Cyril Mango donated his extensive private library to the Gennadius Library who held a symposium in honour of his 80th birthday in 2008 entitled “Byzantine Athens: Monuments, Excavations, Inscriptions” and, photographs, attributed to him, are held in the Conway Library whose archive of primarily architectural images is being digitised as part of the wider Courtauld Connects project.

== Personal life ==
He married Mabel Grover in 1953, but the marriage ended. He later married Susan A. Gerstel in 1964, but this marriage also ended. Ultimately, he married Marlia Mundell in 1976. He had two daughters, one from his marriage to Mabel and one from his marriage to Susan.

== Bibliography ==
- The Brazen House: A Study of the Vestibule of the Imperial Palace of Constantinople (1959)
- Materials for the study of the mosaics of St. Sophia at Istanbul (1962)
- The Treasures of Turkey: The Earliest Civilizations of Anatolia, Byzantium, the Islamic Period. Cyril Mango, Ekrem Akurgal, and Richard Ettinghausen (1966), Editions d'Art Albert Skira, Geneva, 253 pp.
- The Art of Byzantine Empire (1972)
- Byzantine Architecture (1976)
- Byzantium: The Empire of New Rome (1980)
- Byzantium and its Image: History and Culture of the Byzantine Empire and its Heritage (1984)
- Le développement urbain de Constantinople (IVe - VIIe siècles) (1985)
- Studies on Constantinople (1993)
- Hagia Sophia: A Vision for Empires (1997); text by Cyril Mango, photographs by Ahmet Ertuğ
- Chora: The Scroll of Heaven (2000); text by Cyril Mango, photographs by Ahmet Ertuğ
- The Oxford History of Byzantium (2002); edited by Cyril Mango

== Sources ==
- Ševčenko, Ihor (1998), "Preface", in Ševčenko, Ihor; Hutter, Irmgard (eds.), Aetos: Studies in honour of Cyril Mango presented to him on 14 April 1998, Stuttgart: Teubner, pp. ix–xii, doi:10.1515/9783110958614.fm, ISBN 3519074400
- Pitarakis, Brigitte (19 February 2021), Cyril A. Mango: An Englishman in Istanbul, İstanbul Research Institute
- "Mango, Prof. Cyril Alexander", Who's Who 2023, A & C Black, 1 December 2021, doi:10.1093/ww/9780199540884.013.U26489
