= Edmund Keeley =

American writer (1928–2022)

- Born: Edmund Leroy Keeley; February 5, 1928; Damascus, State of Syria
- Died: February 23, 2022 (aged 94); Princeton, New Jersey, U.S.
- Education: Princeton University (BA); Oxford University (D.Phil)
- Occupations: Writer, translator, professor
- Spouse: Mary Stathato-Kyris (m. 1951; died 2012)

Edmund Leroy "Mike" Keeley (February 5, 1928 – February 23, 2022) was an American novelist, translator, and essayist, a poet, and Charles Barnwell Straut Professor of English at Princeton University. He was a noted expert on the Greek poets C. P. Cavafy, George Seferis, Odysseus Elytis, and Yannis Ritsos, and on post-Second World War Greek history.

== Life and career ==
Keeley was born in Damascus, Syria, on February 5, 1928, the son of the American diplomat James Hugh Keeley, Jr. and Mathilde (Vossler) Keeley, a homemaker. His brother was the diplomat Robert V. Keeley. He spent his childhood in Canada, Greece, and Washington, D.C., before earning his BA from Princeton University in 1949. In 1952 he received a doctorate in Comparative Literature from Oxford University where he studied with a fellowship from the Woodrow Wilson National Fellowship Foundation.

Keeley served twice as president of the Modern Greek Studies Association from 1970 to 1973 and 1980 to 1982, and as president of PEN American Center from 1992 to 1994. He retired from a long career of teaching English, creative writing, and Hellenic studies at Princeton University in 1994.

His fiction and non-fiction are often set in Greece, where he spent part of each year, but also in Europe and the Balkans, where he has frequently traveled, and in Thailand and Washington, D.C.. He lived with his wife Mary Stathato-Kyris (married in 1951) in Princeton, New Jersey, from 1954 until her death in 2012. Keeley died from complications of a blood clot at his home in Princeton, New Jersey on February 23, 2022, at the age of 94.

== Awards ==
- 1959 Rome Prize American Academy of Arts and Letters
- 1959 Guggenheim Fellowship
- New Jersey Authors Award:
  - 1960 For the novel The Libation (Citation)
  - 1968 For George Seferis: Collected Poems, 1924-1955
  - 1970 For the novel The Impostor
- 1962 Guinness Poetry Award selection
- 1972 Guggenheim Fellowship
- 1973 National Book Award in Translation (finalist)
- 1975 P.E.N.-Columbia University Translation Center Prize
- 1980 Harold Morton Landon Translation Award, Academy of American Poets
- 1982 Howard T. Behrman Award for Distinguished Achievement in the Humanities
- 1983 PEN/National Endowment for the Arts Fiction Syndicate Award
- 1984-85 Pushcart Prize Selection
- 1987 First European Prize for Translation of Poetry
- 1992 National Translation Award (Citation)
- 1994 Honorary Doctorate, University of Athens
- 1999 Academy Award in Literature
- 2000 PEN/Ralph Manheim Medal for Translation
- 2000 Criticos Prize, London Hellenic Society
- 2001 Commander of the Order of the Phoenix
- 2003 The Yale Review Prize
- 2003 Trustees' Annual Award, Gennadius Library
- 2004 Phidippides Award
- 2006 Honorary Doctorate, Richard Stockton College
- 2008 Dido Sotiriou Cultural Prize, Hellenic Authors' Society
- 2008 Lord Byron Award, Hellenic College
- 2010 Honorary Doctorate, University of Cyprus
- 2014 PEN Award for Poetry in Translation, for co-translator of Diaries of Exile by Yannis Ritsos

== Books ==
- The Libation. Charles Scribner's & Sons. 1958.
- The Gold-hatted Lover. Little, Brown and Company. 1961.
- The Imposter. Doubleday. 1970.
- Voyage to a Dark Island. Curtis Books. 1972.
- Problems in rendering Modern Greek. 1975.
- Cavafy's Alexandria: Study of a Myth in Progress. Harvard University Press. 1976.
- Ritsos in Parentheses. Princeton University Press. 1979.
- A Wilderness Called Peace. Simon & Schuster. 1985. ISBN 0-671-47416-2.
- The Salonika Bay Murder, Cold War Politics and the Polk Affair. Princeton University Press. 1989. ISBN 9780691055657.
- School for Pagan Lovers. Rutgers University Press. 1993. ISBN 0-8135-1935-7.
- Albanian Journal, the Road to Elbasan. White Pine Press. 1997. ISBN 1-877727-76-8.
- On Translation: Reflections and Conversations. Harwood Academic Publishers. 1998.
- Inventing Paradise. The Greek Journey, 1937-47. Farrar, Straus and Giroux. 1999. ISBN 9780374177171.
- Some Wine for Remembrance. White Pine Press. 2002. ISBN 1-893996-15-8.
- Borderlines, A Memoir. White Pine Press. 2005. ISBN 1-893996-33-6.
- The Megabuilders of Queenston Park. Wild River Books. 2014. ISBN 978-0-9839188-4-4
- Requiem for Mary. Greenhouse Review Press. 2015. ISBN 978-0-9838094-2-5
- The Problem of Time and Other Poems. Greenhouse Review Press. 2018. ISBN 978-0-9838094-4-9

== Editor and translator ==
- Six Poets of Modern Greece (With Philip Sherrard) Alfred A. Knopf, 1961
- Vassilis Vassilikos, 'The Plant,' 'The Well,' 'The Angel': A Trilogy (With Mary Keeley) Knopf, 1964.
- Four Greek Poets (With Philip Sherrard) Penguin Books, 1965
- George Seferis, Collected Poems: 1924-1955 (With Philip Sherrard) Princeton University Press, 1967 - ISBN 0-691-01300-4
- C. P. Cavafy, Passions and Ancient Days (with George Savidis) Hogarth Press, 1972 ISBN 0-7012-0351-X
- Modern Greek Writers: Solomos, Calvos, Matesis, Palamas, Cavafy, Kazantzakis, Seferis, Elytis (With Peter Bien) Princeton University Press, 1972
- C. P. Cavafy, Selected Poems (With Philip Sherrard) Princeton University Press, 1972
- Odysseus Elytis, The Axion Esti (with George Savidis) Pittsburgh University Press, 1972
- C. P. Cavafy, Three Poems of Passion (with George Savidis) Plain Wrapper Press, 1975
- C. P. Cavafy, Collected Poems (With Philip Sherrard and George Savidis) Princeton University Press, 1975, revised edition, Princeton University Press, 1992. - ISBN 0-691-01537-6
- Angelos Sikelianos, Selected Poems (With Philip Sherrard) Princeton University Press, 1979
- Odysseus Elytis, Selected Poems Viking-Penguin, 1981 - ISBN 0-670-29246-X
- The Dark Crystal: An Anthology of Modern Greek Poetry (With Philip Sherrard) Denise Harvey & CO, 1981
- Voices of Modern Greece: Selected Poems of C.P. Cavafy, Angelos Sikelianos, George Seferis, Odysseus Elytis, Nikos Gatsos (With Philip Sherrard) Princeton University Press, 1981 - ISBN 0-691-01382-9
- Yannis Ritsos, Return and Other Poems Parallel Editions, 1983
- C. P. Cavafy, A Selection of Poems (with Philip Sherrard) Camberwell Press, 1985
- Yannis Ritsos, Exile and Return: Selected Poems, 1967-74 Ecco Press, 1985
- The Legacy of R.P. Blackmur: Essays, Memoirs, Texts (with Edward T. Cone and Joseph Frank) Ecco Press, 1987 ISBN 0-88001-152-1
- Yannis Ritsos: Repetitions, Testimonies, Parentheses Princeton University Press, 1991 ISBN 0-691-01908-8
- The Essential Cavafy (With Philip Sherrard) Ecco Press, 1995 - ISBN 0-691-01491-4
- George Seferis, Collected Poems, (With Philip Sherrard) Princeton University Press, 1995
- George Seferis and Edmund Keeley: Correspondence, 1951-1971 Princeton University Library, 1997 ISBN 0-87811-042-9
- A Century of Greek Poetry 1900-2000: Bilingual Edition (with Peter Bien, Peter Constantine, and Karen Van Dyck) Cosmos Publishing, 2004 - ISBN 1-932455-00-0
- Selected Poems Of Odysseus Elytis (with Philip Sherrard) Anvil Press, 2007 ISBN 0-85646-355-8
- The Greek Poets: Homer to the Present (co-editor) W. W. Norton, 2009
- ″Angelos Sikelianos: Selected Poems″,(with Philip Sherrard), second bilingual edition, Denise Harvey (publisher), 1996, ISBN 960-7120-12-4

Preceded by none	Straut Professor of English at Princeton University; 1992–1994	Succeeded by Michael Wood
