= Michael Silk =

British classicist (born 1941)

Michael Stephen Silk FBA (born 11 June 1941) is a British classical scholar.

== Biography ==
Silk was born on 11 June 1941. He was educated at King Edward's School, Birmingham from 1953 to 1960. He then studied Classics at St John's College, Cambridge, where he graduated BA in 1964, MA in 1967, and PhD in 1969, and held a research fellowship at the same college from 1967 to 1970. He became a lecturer at King's College London in 1970, becoming full professor in 1991. He was elected a Fellow of the British Academy in 2009.

Following his retirement, he is now an emeritus professor of classical and comparative literature at King's College London. He has authored scholarly works in relation to the theory and practice of tragedy and comedy, Greek poetry and drama, literary theory, and the classical tradition.

== Selected publications ==
- Silk, Michael (1974). Interaction in Poetic Imagery, with Special Reference to Early Greek Poetry. Cambridge University Press. ISBN 9780521204170.
- Silk, Michael; Stern, J. P., eds. (1981). Nietzsche on Tragedy. Cambridge University Press. ISBN 9780521232623.
- Silk, Michael (1987). Homer: The Iliad. Cambridge University Press. ISBN 9780521328142.
- Silk, Michael (1996). Tragedy and the Tragic: Greek Theatre and Beyond. Oxford University Press. ISBN 9780198149514.
- Silk, Michael (2000). Aristophanes and the Definition of Comedy. Oxford University Press. ISBN 9780198140290.
- Hirst, Anthony; Silk, Michael, eds. (2004). Alexandria, Real and Imagined. Ashgate. ISBN 9780754638902.
- Georgakopoulou, Alexandra; Silk, Michael, eds. (2009). Standard Languages and Language Standards: Greek, Past and Present. Ashgate. ISBN 9780754664376.
- Silk, Michael; Gildenhard, Ingo; Barrow, Rosemary J., eds. (2014). The Classical Tradition: Art, Literature, Thought. Wiley-Blackwell. ISBN 9781118610480.
