= Roderick Beaton =

British academic (born 1951)

Sir Roderick Macleod Beaton, FBA, FKC (born 29 September 1951) is a retired academic. He was Koraes Professor of Modern Greek and Byzantine History, Language and Literature at King's College London from 1988 to 2018.

== Education ==
Born in 1951, Beaton was educated at George Watson's College, Edinburgh, and Peterhouse, Cambridge, graduating with an English literature degree in 1973. He remained there to complete his PhD, which was awarded in 1977 for his thesis "Myth and tradition in modern Greek folk poetry, a study of non-literate tradition, its technique and aims, in the context of lyric and ballad, rather than epic poetry."

== Career ==
Beaton spent three years as the Ouranis Foundation Fellow in Modern Greek at the University of Birmingham (1977–80) before joining King's College London in 1981 as a lecturer. He was appointed Koraes Professor of Modern Greek and Byzantine History, Language and Literature at King's College in 1988, and was also head of the Department of Byzantine and Modern Greek Studies from 1988 to 1994 and again from 1995 to 1998, and director of the Centre for Hellenic Studies from 2012 to 2016. He also held a Major Leverhulme Fellowship from 2009 to 2012. He retired from his chair at King's College in 2018.

== Honours ==
In 2013, Beaton was elected a Fellow of the British Academy, the United Kingdom's national academy for the humanities and social sciences. He was also elected a Fellow of King's College London in 2018.

On 9 September 2019 he was appointed Commander of the Order of Honour by Greek President Prokopis Pavlopoulos for his lifelong contribution to the promotion of medieval and modern Greek studies and culture.

He was knighted in the 2024 King's Birthday Honours "for services to history and to UK/Greece relations".

== Bibliography ==
- Europe: A New History (Basic Books, 2026)
- The Greek Revolution of 1821 and its Global Significance (Aiora Press, 2021)
- The Greeks: A Global History (Basic Books, 2021)
- Greece: Biography of a Modern Nation (Penguin Books Ltd, 2019)
- Byron's War: Romantic Rebellion, Greek Revolution (Cambridge University Press, 2013)
- The Making of Modern Greece: Nationalism, Romanticism, and the Uses of the Past (1797–1896) (Co-edited with D. Ricks), (Publications of the Centre for Hellenic Studies, King's College London, Ashgate, 2009)
- George Seferis: Waiting for the Angel: A Biography (Yale University Press, 2003)
- An Introduction to Modern Greek Literature (Oxford University Press, 1999)
- The Medieval Greek Romance (Cambridge Studies in Medieval Literature, no. 6, Cambridge University Press, 1989)
- Folk Poetry of Modern Greece (Cambridge University Press, 1980)
