= Journal of Modern Greek Studies =

- Discipline: Area studies
- Language: English
- Edited by: Maria Koundoura

Publication details
- History: 1983–present
- Publisher: Johns Hopkins University Press (United States)
- Frequency: Biannually

Standard abbreviations
- ISO 4: J. Mod. Greek Stud.

Indexing
- ISSN: 0738-1727 (print); 1086-3265 (web)
- OCLC no.: 33893552

Links
- Journal homepage; Online access

The Journal of Modern Greek Studies is an academic journal founded in 1983, and is the official publication of the Modern Greek Studies Association. It is devoted to the study of social, cultural, and political affairs in modern Greece, defined as the late Byzantine period to the present. The journal covers historical, literary, anthropological, artistic, and other aspects of contemporary Greek society. The current editor is Maria Koundoura of Emerson College. The journal is published biannually, in May and October, by the Johns Hopkins University Press.
