= Koraes Professor of Modern Greek and Byzantine History, Language and Literature =

Chair at King's College London

The Koraes Professor of Modern Greek and Byzantine History, Language and Literature is a chair in the Classics Department at King's College London. It was established in 1918 to serve as a focal point in the United Kingdom and beyond for the study of Greek history and culture from the end of antiquity to the present day.

The establishment of the Koraes Chair was championed by the likes of the Anglo-Hellenic League and Eleftherios Venizelos, then Prime Minister of the Hellenic Parliament and a close friend of King's College Principal Ronald Montagu Burrows. Burrows was himself a famous classical scholar and philhellene.

The Koraes Chair is named in honour of Adamantios Koraes, the founding father of the modern Greek nation state.

== List of Koraes Professor ==
Since its creation, there have been seven holders of the chair:

- 1919–1924: Arnold J. Toynbee
- 1926–1943: Frederick Henry Marshall
- 1946–1960: Romilly Jenkins
- 1963–1968: Cyril Mango
- 1970–1988: Donald Nicol
- 1988–2018: Roderick Beaton
- 2018–present: Gonda Van Steen
