= Nicholas Egon =

Czech portrait painter

Nicholas Egon FRSA FKC, (15 November 1921 – 25 April 2017) was a national of Czechoslovakia who emigrated to the United Kingdom where he became a leading portrait painter.

He first came to the United Kingdom about 1938. Near the end of World War II he served as the official artist with the British military in Basra.
