= Modern Greek Studies Association =

The Modern Greek Studies Association (MGSA) is a scholarly organization for modern Greek studies in North America. It was founded in 1968.

It is interdisciplinary, covering language, history, politics, economics, society, and the arts of modern Greece, broadly defined.

The MGSA sponsors the Journal of Modern Greek Studies (1983- , ISSN 0738-1727, e-ISSN 1086-3265), the only scholarly periodical to focus exclusively on modern Greece. It covers Greek history, society, politics, and culture from the late Byzantine period to the present. Choice Reviews has praised it as "a magnificent scholarly journal".

Its biennial symposia are a focus for scholars of modern Greece in North America.

== List of presidents ==
The following have served as President of the Modern Greek Studies Association:.

- 1970-73: Edmund Keeley
- 1974-76: John A. Petropulos
- 1977-79: A. Lily Macrakis
- 1980-82: Edmund Keeley
- 1983-85: Peter Bien
- 1986-88: P. Nikiforos Diamandouros
- 1988-90: Van Coufoudakis
- 1991-92: Michael Herzfeld
- 1993-95: Adamantia Pollis
- 1995-97: John Chioles
- 1997-99: Van Coufoudakis
- 2000-02: Peter Bien
- 2003-05: Thomas Gallant
- 2006-11: Stathis Gourgouris
- 2011-14: Gonda Van Steen
- 2014-17: Neovi Karakatsanis
- 2017-20: Franklin L. Hess
