= Gonda Van Steen =

American university teacher (born 1964)

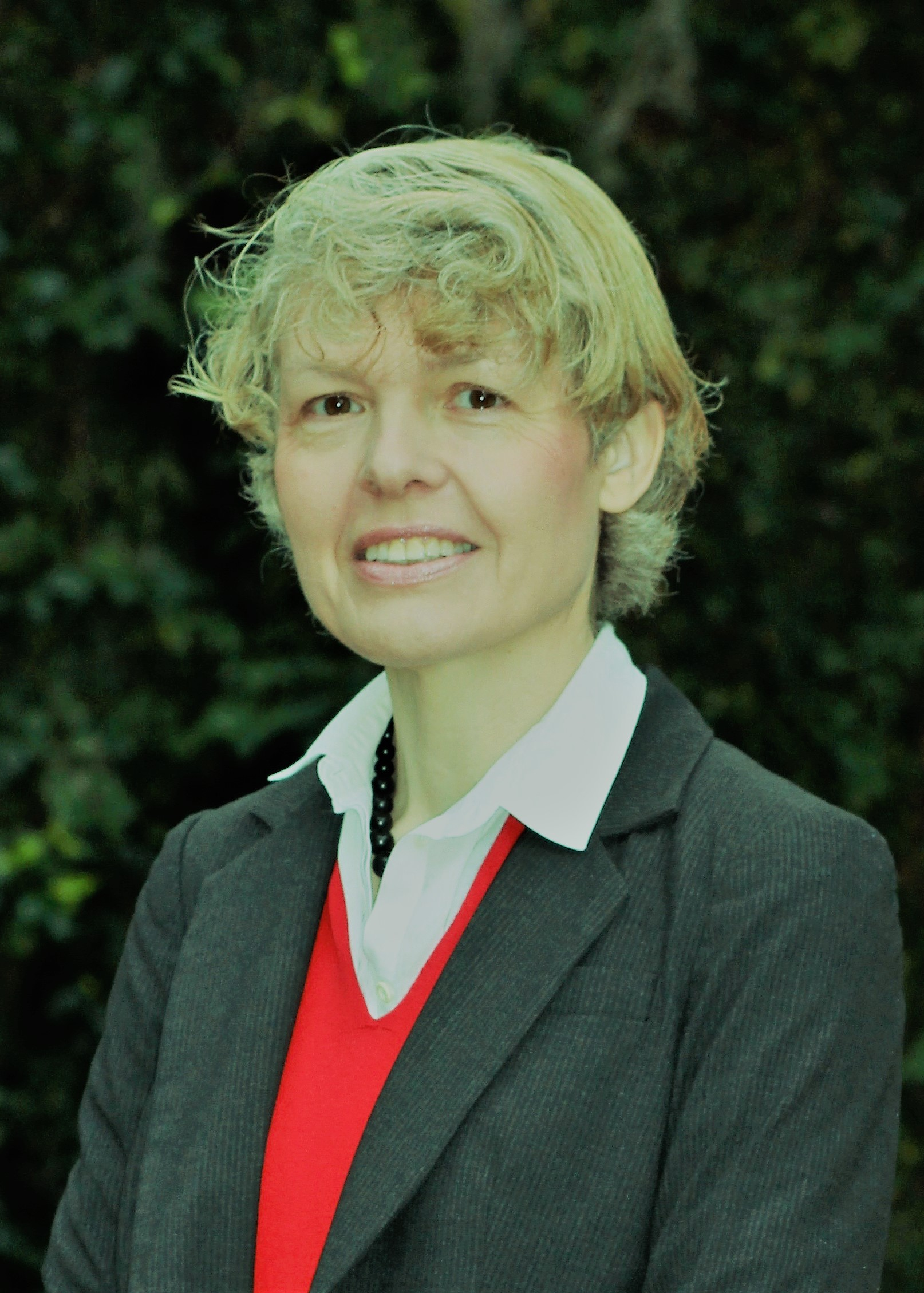
- Van Steen in 2018
- Born: 8 April 1964 (age 62); Aalst, Belgium

Academic background
- Education: University of Ghent (BA, MA); Princeton University (MA, PhD)
- Thesis: Aristophanes in Modern Greece: From Textual Reception to Performance Dialectics (1995)

Academic work
- Discipline: Classicist
- Sub-discipline: Greek language and literature
- Institutions: King's College London; University of Florida; University of Arizona; Cornell University

Gonda Aline Hector Van Steen (born 8 April 1964 in Aalst, Belgium) is a Belgian-American classical scholar and linguist, who specialises in ancient and modern Greek language and literature. Since 2018, she has been Koraes Professor of Modern Greek and Byzantine History, Language and Literature, the first woman to hold this position, and Director of the Centre for Hellenic Studies at King's College London. She previously held the Cassas Chair in Greek Studies at the University of Florida, and taught at the University of Arizona and at Cornell University. She has also served as the President of the Modern Greek Studies Association (2012–2014). Since 2013, she has been leading a campaign (Nostos for Greek Adoptees) to restore records and Greek citizenship to Greek-born adoptees, which culminated in a Greek legal change published on 2 May 2025.

In the Fall of 2022, Gonda Van Steen was a Residential Fellow at the Swedish Collegium for Advanced Study in Uppsala, Sweden.

== Selected works ==
- Van Steen, Gonda (2019). Adoption, Memory, and Cold War Greece: Kid pro quo?. University of Michigan Press. ISBN 978-0472131587. Translated into Greek as Ζητούνται παιδιά από την Ελλάδα: Υιοθεσίες στην Αμερική του Ψυχρού Πολέμου, Potamos editions, 2021. ISBN 978-9605451738.
- Van Steen, Gonda (2015). Stage of Emergency: Theater and Public Performance under the Greek Military Dictatorship of 1967–1974. Oxford: Oxford University Press. ISBN 978-0198718321.
- Van Steen, Gonda (2011). Theatre of the Condemned: Classical Tragedy on Greek Prison Islands. Oxford: Oxford University Press. ISBN 978-0199572885.
- Van Steen, Gonda (2010). Liberating Hellenism from the Ottoman Empire: Comte de Marcellus and the Last of the Classics. New York: Palgrave Macmillan. ISBN 978-0230100237.
- Van Steen, Gonda A. H. (2000). Venom in Verse: Aristophanes in Modern Greece. Princeton, NJ: Princeton University Press. ISBN 978-0691009568.
