= A. H. M. Jones =

British historian of classical antiquity (1904–1970)

A. H. M. Jones

Arnold Hugh Martin Jones FBA (9 March 1904 – 9 April 1970), known also as A. H. M. Jones or Hugo Jones, was a 20th-century British historian of classical antiquity, particularly of the later Roman Empire.

== Work ==
Jones's book, The Later Roman Empire, 284–602 (1964), is a narrative history of late Rome and early Byzantium, beginning with the reign of the Roman tetrarch Diocletian and ending with that of the Byzantine emperor Maurice. A modern criticism of this work is its almost total reliance on literary and epigraphic primary sources, a methodology which mirrored Jones's own historiographical training. Archaeological study of the period was in its infancy when Jones wrote, which limited the amount of material culture he could include in his research.

He published his first book, The Cities of the Eastern Roman Provinces, in 1937. In 1946, he was appointed to the chair of the Ancient History department at University College, London. In 1951, he moved to Cambridge University and assumed the same post there. He was elected a Fellow of the British Academy in 1947.

Jones was reportedly an extremely fast reader with an encyclopedic memory. His disdain for "small talk" sometimes made him seem remote and cold to those who did not know him well, but he was warmly regarded by his students. He was sometimes criticised for not fully acknowledging the work of other scholars in his own footnotes, a habit he was aware of and apologised for in the preface to his first book.

Jones died of a heart attack in 1970 while travelling by boat to Thessaloniki to give a series of lectures. In 1972, John Crook published posthumously Jones's draft of The Criminal Courts of the Roman Republic and Principate.

== Works ==
- History of Abyssinia (1935)
- The Cities of the Eastern Roman Provinces (1937)
- The Herods of Judaea (1938)
- The Greek City from Alexander to Justinian (1940)
- Ancient Economic History (1948)
- Constantine and the Conversion of Europe (1948)
- Athenian Democracy (1957)
- Studies in Roman Government and Law (1960)
- The Later Roman Empire, 284–602: A Social, Economic and Administrative Survey (1964)

- The Decline of the Ancient World (1966)
- Documents Illustrating the Reigns of Augustus & Tiberius (with Victor Ehrenberg 1967)
- Sparta (1967)
- Augustus (1970)
- The Prosopography of the Later Roman Empire, with John Robert Martindale and John Morris (1971)
- The Criminal Courts of the Roman Republic and Principate (1972)

Academic offices
Preceded by	Professor of Ancient History, University College, London; 1946–1951	Succeeded by
Preceded by Frank Ezra Adcock	Professor of Ancient History Cambridge University; 1951–1970	Succeeded by Moses Finley
