= Crisis of the Roman Republic =

Political instability c. 134–30 BC

The crisis of the Roman Republic was an extended period of political instability and social unrest from about c. 133 BC to 30 BC that culminated in the demise of the Roman Republic and the advent of the Roman Empire.

The crisis was rooted in deep structural tensions—chief among them the breakdown of the political code known as the mos maiorum, widening inequality among wealth and land, and class conflict between the traditional aristocracy (optimates) and those who sought power by championing the cause of the common people (the populares). These factors were compounded over time as leaders like Marius, Sulla, Pompey, and Julius Caesar established armies personally devoted to them rather than the state.

Traditionally, the expansion of citizenship (with all its rights, privileges, and duties) was viewed negatively by the contemporary Sallust, the modern Edward Gibbon, and others of their respective schools, both ancient and modern, because it caused internal dissension, disputes with Rome's Italian allies, slave revolts, and riots. However, other scholars have argued that because the Republic was conceived as a res publica – the essential thing of the people – the poor and disenfranchised cannot be blamed for trying to redress their legitimate and legal grievances.

== Arguments on a single crisis ==
More recently, beyond arguments about when the crisis of the Republic began (see below), there also has been disagreement whether events comprised a singular or multiple crisis. Harriet Flower, in 2010, proposed a different paradigm encompassing multiple "republics" for the general whole of the traditional republican period with attempts at reform rather than a single "crisis" occurring over a period of eighty years. Instead of a single crisis of the late Republic, Flower proposes a series of crises and transitional periods (excerpted only to the chronological periods after 139 BC):

Proposed chronological periods (139–33 BC)
Years BC	Description
139–88	Republic 5: Third republic of the nobiles
88–81	Transitional period starting with Sulla's first coup and ending with his dictatorship
81–60	Republic 6: Sulla's republic (modified during Pompey and Crassus' consulship in 70)
59–53	First Triumvirate
52–49	Transitional period (lead-up to Caesar's Civil War)
49–44	Caesar's dictatorship, with short transitional period after his death
43–33	Second Triumvirate

Each different republic had different circumstances and while overarching themes can be traced, "there was no single, long republic that carried the seeds of its own destruction in its aggressive tendency to expand and in the unbridled ambitions of its leading politicians". The implications of this view put the fall of the republic in a context based around the collapse of the republican political culture of the nobiles and emphasis on Sulla's civil war followed by the fall of Sulla's republic in Caesar's civil war.

== History ==
After the Second Punic War, income inequality increased significantly. While the landed peasantry was drafted to serve in increasingly long campaigns, their farms and homesteads fell into bankruptcy. Significant mineral wealth was distributed unevenly to the population; the city of Rome itself expanded considerably in opulence and size; the manumission of slaves brought to Italy by conquest massively expanded the number of urban and rural poor. The republic, for reasons still debated by historians, in 177 BC also stopped regularly establishing Roman colonies in Italy. One of the major functions of these colonies was to provide land for the urban and rural poor, increasing the draft pool of landed farmers as well as providing economic opportunities to the lower classes.

=== Political violence ===
The tribunate of Tiberius Gracchus in 133 BC led to a breakup of the long-standing norms of the republican constitution. Gracchus' main aim was land reform and he was successful in passing legislation to pursue it. Gracchus' legislation would challenge the socio-political power of the old aristocracy, along with eroding their economic interests. (Note: Nb that Gracchus was in fact successful in passing his land reform bill. He was not, however, successful in being returned for a consecutive term as tribune.)

This was only after an unconstitutional attempt by Marcus Octavius, a tribune in the same year as Gracchus, to veto proceedings overwhelmingly supported by the people. Octavius' actions caused Gracchus to take similarly novel norm-breaking actions, that would lead to even greater breakdowns in republican norms.

Gracchus attempted to secure for himself a second term as tribune, which may have been illegal. This led to a backlash that would lead to his assassination by the then-pontifex maximus Scipio Nasica, acting in his role as a private citizen and against the advice of the consul and jurist Publius Mucius Scaevola.

The Senate's violent reaction also served to legitimise the use of violence for political ends. Political violence showed fundamentally that the traditional republican norms that had produced the stability of the middle republic were incapable of resolving conflicts between political actors. As well as inciting revenge killing for previous killings, (Note: Eg Lucius Sergius Catalina killing those who had killed his own family during the Sullan proscriptions.) the repeated episodes also showed the inability of the existing political system to solve pressing matters of the day. The political violence also further divided citizens with different political views and set a precedent that senators—even those without lawful executive authority—could use force to silence citizens merely for holding certain political beliefs.

Tiberius Gracchus' younger brother Gaius Gracchus, who later was to win repeated office to the tribunate so to pass similarly expansive reforms, would be killed by similar violence. Consul Lucius Opimius was empowered by the senate to use military force (including a number of foreign mercenaries from Crete) in a state of emergency declared so to kill Gaius Gracchus, Marcus Fulvius Flaccus and followers. While the citizens killed in the political violence were not declared enemies, it showed clearly that the aristocracy believed violence was a "logical and more effective alternative to political engagement, negotiation, and compromise within the parameters set by existing norms".

Further political violence emerged in 100 BC during the sixth consulship of a famous general known to us Gaius Marius. Marius had been consul consecutively for some years by this point, owing to the immediacy of the Cimbrian War. These consecutive consulships violated Roman law, which mandated a decade between consulships, further weakening the primarily norms-based constitution. Returning to 100 BC, large numbers of armed gangs—perhaps better described as militias—engaged in street violence. A candidate for high office, Gaius Memmius, was also assassinated. Marius was called upon as consul to suppress the violence, which he did, with significant effort and military force. (Note: Flower notes that ironically, while Marius was able to defeat immense armies of Germanic invaders and was hailed with transgiving, triumphs, and other honours, he would retire (shortly) from politics in the 90s BC as a failure for his inability to handle the increasingly violence and anarchic politics of the republic.) His landless legionaries also affected voting directly, as while they could not vote themselves for failing to meet property qualifications, they could intimidate those who could.

=== Sulla's civil war ===
Following the Social War—which had the character of a civil war between Rome's Italian allies and loyalists—which was only resolved by Rome granting citizenship to almost all Italian communities, the main question looming before the state was how the Italians could be integrated into the Roman political system. Tribune Publius Sulpicius Rufus in 88 BC attempted to pass legislation granting greater political rights to the Italians; one of the additions to this legislative programme included a transfer of command of the coming First Mithridatic War from Sulla to Gaius Marius, who had re-entered politics. Flower writes, "by agreeing to promote the career of Marius, Sulpicius ... decided to throw republican norms aside in his bid to control the political scene in Rome and get his reforms" passed.

The attempts to recall Sulla led to his then-unprecedented and utterly unanticipated marching on Rome with his army encamped at Nola (near Naples). This choice collapsed any republican norms about the use of force. In this first (he would invade again) march on Rome, he declared a number of his political opponents enemies of the state and ordered their murder. Marius would escape to his friendly legionary colonies in Africa. Sulpicius was killed. He also installed two new consuls and forced major reforms of the constitution at sword-point, before leaving on campaign against Mithridates.

While Sulla was fighting Mithridates, Lucius Cornelius Cinna dominated domestic Roman politics, controlling elections and other parts of civil life. Cinna and his partisans were no friends of Sulla: they razed Sulla's house in Rome, revoked his command in name, and forced his family to flee the city. Cinna himself would win election to the consulship three times consecutively; he also conducted a purge of his political opponents, displaying their heads on the rostra in the forum. During the war, Rome fielded two armies against Mithridates: one under Sulla and another, fighting both Sulla and Mithridates. Sulla returned in 82 BC at the head of his army, after concluding a generous peace with Mithridates, to retake the city from the domination of the Cinnan faction. After winning a civil war and purging the republic of thousands of political opponents and "enemies" (many of whom were targeted for their wealth), he forced the Assemblies to make him dictator for the settling of the constitution, with an indefinite term. Sulla also created legal barriers, which would only be lifted during the dictatorship of Julius Caesar some forty years later, against political participation by the relatives of those whom he ordered murdered. And with this use of unprecedented violence at a new level, Sulla was able not only to take control of the state, but also retain control, unlike Scipio Nasica or Gaius Marius, both of whom quickly lost their influence after deploying force.

Sulla's dictatorship ended the middle republic's culture of consensus-based senatorial decision-making by purging many of those men who lived by and reproduced that culture. Generally, Sulla's dictatorial reforms attempted to concentrate political power into the Senate and the aristocratic assemblies, whilst trying to reduce the obstructive and legislative powers of the tribune and plebeian council. To this end, he required that all bills presented to the Assemblies first be approved by the Senate, restricted the tribunician veto to only matters of individual requests for clemency, and required that men elected tribune would be barred from all other magistracies. Beyond stripping the tribunate of its powers, the last provision was intended to prevent ambitious youth from seeking the office, by making it a dead end.

Sulla also permanently enlarged the senate by promoting a large number of equestrians from the Italian countryside as well as automatically inducting the now-20 quaestors elected each year into the senate. The senatorial class was so enlarged to staff newly created permanent courts. (Note: Permanent courts, such as the extortion court established by the lex Calpurnia, had been established in the middle republic primarily to try crimes against the state and extortion of the populace. Over time, the jury pool of these courts was enlarged to include equestrians, before shutting out Senators entirely. One of the Sullan reforms was to restrict the pool of these courts back to the Senatorial class.) These reforms were an attempt to formalise and strengthen the legal system so prevent political players from emerging with too much power, as well as to make them accountable to the enlarged senatorial class.

He also rigidly formalised the cursus honorum by clearly stating the progression of office and associated age requirements. Next, to aid administration, he doubled the number of quaestors to 20 and added two more praetors; the greater number of magistrates also meant he could shorten the length of provincial assignments (and lessen the chances of building provincial power bases) by increasing the rate of turnover. Moreover, magistrates were barred from seeking reelection to any post for ten years and barred for two years from holding any other post after their term ended.

After securing election as consul in 80 BC, Sulla resigned the dictatorship and attempted to solidify his republican constitutional reforms. Sulla's reforms proved unworkable. The first years of Sulla's new republic were faced not only the continuation of the civil war against Quintus Sertorius in Spain, but also a revolt in 78 BC by the then-consul Marcus Aemilius Lepidus. With significant popular unrest, the tribunate's powers were quickly restored by 70 BC by Sulla's own lieutenants': Pompey and Crassus. Sulla passed legislation to make it illegal to march on Rome as he had, but having just shown that doing so would bring no personal harm so long as one was victorious, this obviously had little effect. Sulla's actions and civil war fundamentally weakened the authority of the constitution and created a clear precedent that an ambitious general could make an end-run around the entire republican constitution simply by force of arms. The stronger law courts created by Sulla, along with reforms to provincial administration that forced consuls to stay in the city for the duration of their terms (rather than running to their provincial commands upon election), also weakened the republic: the stringent punishments of the courts helped to destabilise, as commanders would rather start civil wars than subject themselves to them, and the presence of both consuls in the city increased chances of deadlock. Many Romans also followed Sulla's example and turned down provincial commands, concentrating military experience and glory into an even smaller circle of leading generals.

=== Collapse of the republic ===
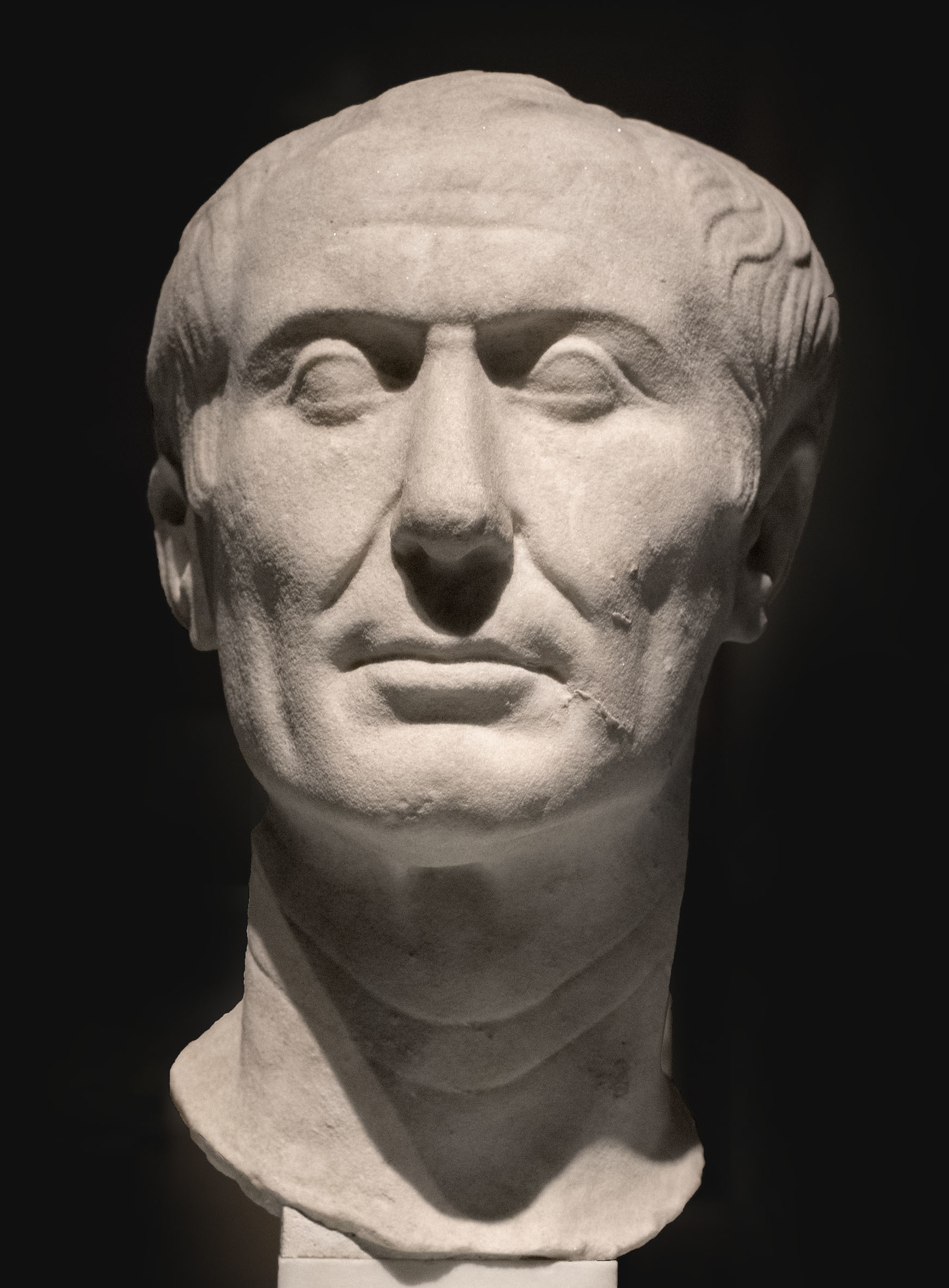
The only bust of Julius Caesar known to be made during his lifetime

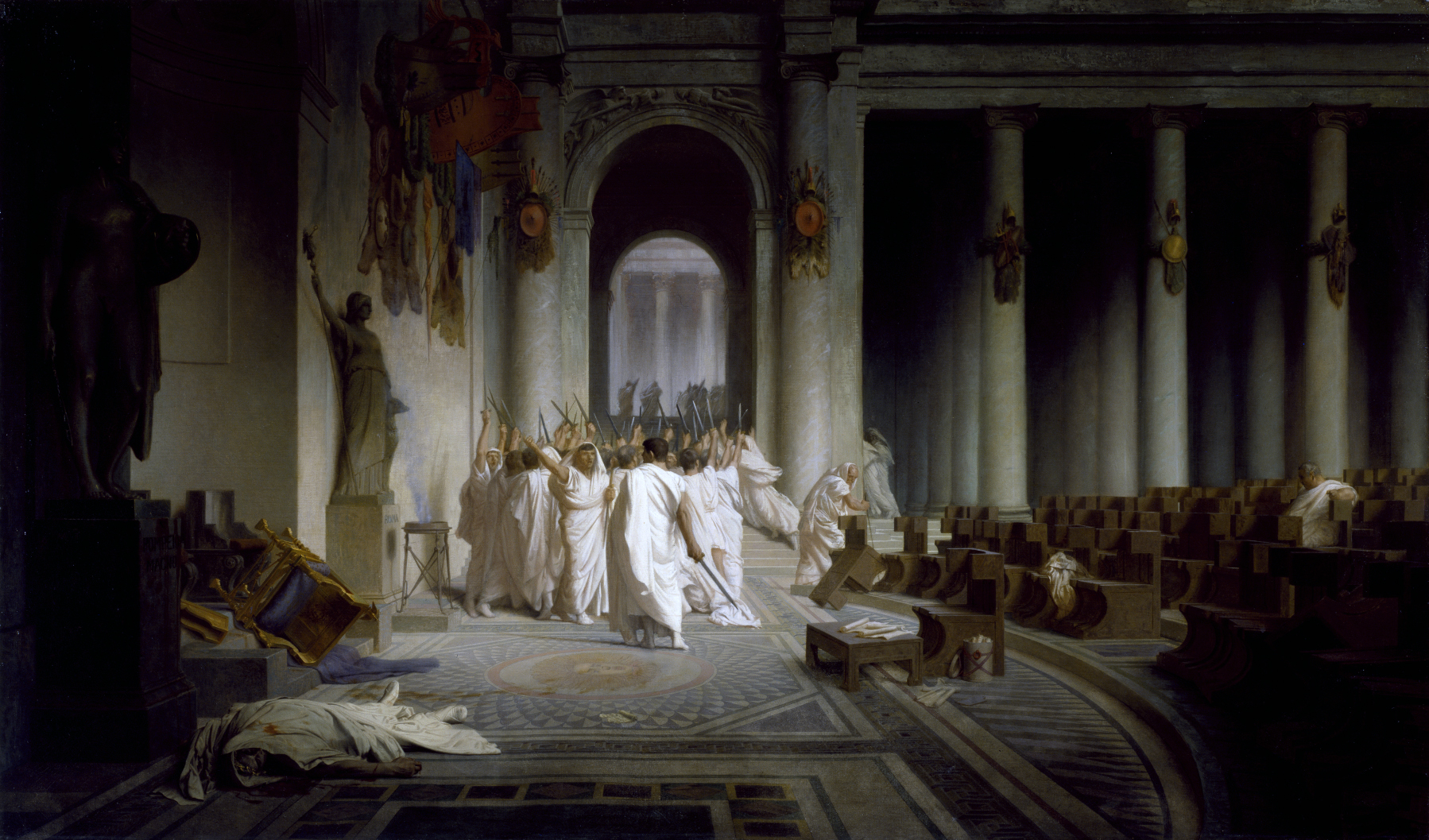
An 1867 depiction of the death of Caesar, from The Death of Caesar, Jean-Léon Gérôme

Over the course of the late republic, formerly authoritative institutions lost their credibility and authority. For example, the Sullan reforms to the Senate strongly split the aristocratic class between those who stayed in the city and those who rose to high office abroad, further increasing class divides between Romans, even at the highest levels. Furthermore, the dominance of the military in the late republic, along with stronger ties between a general and his troops, caused by their longer terms of service together and the troops' reliance on that general to provide for their retirements, along with an obstructionist central government, made a huge number of malcontent soldiers willing to take up arms against the state. Adding in the institutionalisation of violence as a means to obstruct or force political change (eg the deaths of the Gracchi and Sulla's dictatorship, respectively), the republic was caught in an ever more violent and anarchic struggle between the Senate, assemblies at Rome, and the promagistrates.

Even by the early-60s BC, political violence began to reassert itself, with unrest at the consular elections noted at every year between 66 and 63. The revolt of Catiline—which we hear much about from the consul for that year, Cicero—was put down by violating the due process rights of citizens and introducing the death penalty to the Roman government's relationship with its citizens. The anarchy of republican politics since the Sullan reforms had done nothing to address agrarian reform, the civic disabilities of proscribed families, or intense factionalism between Marian and Sullan supporters. Through this whole period, Pompey's extraordinary multi-year commands in the east made him wealthy and powerful; his return in 62 BC could not be handled within the context of a republican system: his achievements were not recognised but nor could he be dispatched away from the city to win more victories. His extraordinary position created a "volatile situation that the senate and the magistrates at home could not control". Both Cicero's actions during his consulship and Pompey's great military successes challenged the republic's legal codes that were meant to restrain ambition and defer punishments to the courts.

The domination of the state by the three-man group of the First Triumvirate—Caesar, Crassus, and Pompey—from 59 BC did little to restore order or peace in Rome. The first "triumvirate" dominated republican politics by controlling elections, continually holding office, and violating the law through their long periods of ex officio political immunity. This political authority so dominated other magistrates that they were unwilling to oppose their policies or voice opposition. Political violence both became more acute and chaotic: the total anarchy that emerged in the mid-50s by duelling street gangs under the control of Publius Clodius Pulcher and Titus Annius Milo prevented orderly consular elections repeatedly in the 50s. The destruction of the senate house and escalation of violence continued until Pompey was simply appointed by the senate, without consultation of the assemblies, as sole consul in 52 BC. The domination of the city by Pompey and repeated political irregularities led to Caesar being unwilling to subject himself to what he considered to be biased courts and unfairly administered laws, starting Caesar's civil war.

Whether the period starting with Caesar's civil war should really be called a portion of the republic is a matter of scholarly debate. After Caesar's victory, he ruled a dictatorial regime until his assassination in 44 BC at the hands of the Liberatores. The Caesarian faction quickly gained control of the state. They inaugurated the Second Triumvirate comprising Caesar's adopted son Octavian and the dictator's two most important supporters, Mark Antony and Marcus Aemilius Lepidus, purged their political enemies, and successfully defeated the assassins in the Liberators' civil war at the Battle of Philippi. The Second Triumvirate failed to reach any mutually agreeable resolution, leading to the final civil war and permanent collapse of the Republic. Octavian, now Augustus, became the first Roman Emperor in 27 BC and transformed the oligarchic republic into the autocratic Roman Empire.

== Historiography ==
=== Periodization – dating the crisis ===
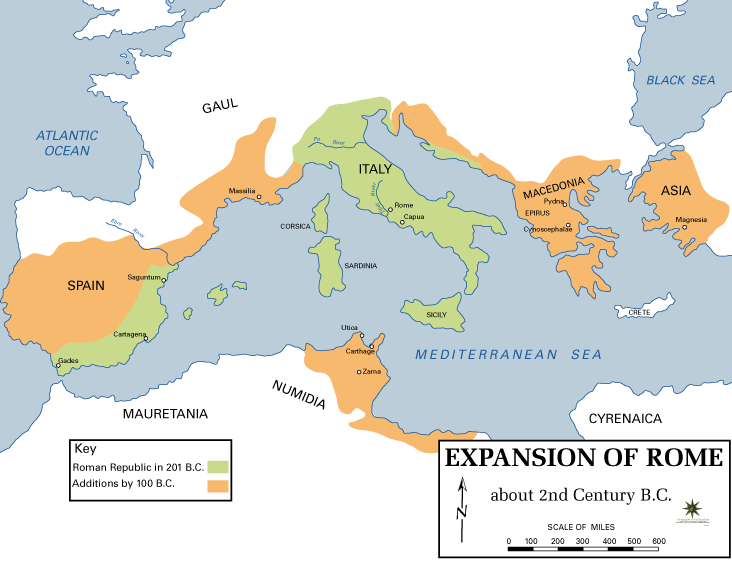
The Roman Republic in 100 BC

For centuries, historians have argued about periodization, the start, specific crises involved, and end date for the crisis of the Roman Republic. As a culture (or "web of institutions"), Florence Dupont and Christopher Woodall wrote, "no distinction is made between different periods." However, referencing Livy's opinion in his History of Rome, they assert that Romans lost liberty through their own conquests' "morally undermining consequences."

==== Arguments for an early start-date (c. 134 to 73 BC) ====
Von Ungern-Sternberg argues for an exact start date of 10 December 134 BC, with the inauguration of Tiberius Gracchus as tribune, or alternately, when he first issued his proposal for land reform in 133 BC. The Greek historian Appian of Alexandria wrote that this political crisis was "the preface to ... the Roman civil wars". The Roman historian Velleius Paterculus commented that it was Gracchus' unprecedented standing for re-election as tribune in 133 BC, and the riots and controversy it engendered, which started the crisis:

This was the beginning of civil bloodshed and of the free reign [sic] of swords in the city of Rome. From then on justice was overthrown by force and the strongest was preeminent.

In any case, the assassination of Tiberius Gracchus in 133 BC marked "a turning point in Roman history and the beginning of the crisis of the Roman Republic."

Barbette S. Spaeth specifically refers to "the Gracchan crisis at the beginning of the Late Roman Republic ...".

Nic Fields, in his popular history of Spartacus, argues for a start date of 135 BC with the beginning of the First Servile War in Sicily. Fields asserts:

The rebellion of the slaves in Italy under Spartacus may have been the best organized, but it was not the first of its kind. There had been other rebellions of slaves that afflicted Rome, and we may assume that Spartacus was wise enough to profit by their mistakes.

The start of the Social War (91–87 BC), when Rome's nearby Italian allies rebelled against her rule, may be thought of as the beginning of the end of the Republic. Fields also suggests that things got much worse with the Samnite engagement at the Battle of the Colline Gate in 82 BC, the climax of the war between Sulla and the supporters of Gaius Marius.

Barry Strauss argues that the crisis really started with "The Spartacus War" in 73 BC, adding that, because the dangers were unappreciated, "Rome faced the crisis with mediocrities".

==== Arguments for a later start date (69 to 44 BC) ====
Pollio dates the Crisis only from the time of Julius Caesar in 60 BC. Caesar's crossing of the Rubicon, a river marking the northern boundary of Roman Italy, with his army in 49 BC, a flagrant violation of Roman law, has become the clichéd point of no return for the Republic, as noted in many books, including Tom Holland's Rubicon: The Last Years of the Roman Republic.

==== Arguments for an end date (49 to 27 BC) ====
The end of the Crisis can likewise either be dated from the assassination of Julius Caesar on 15 March 44 BC, after he and Sulla had done so much "to dismantle the government of the Republic", or alternately when Octavian was granted the title of Augustus by the Senate in 27 BC, marking the beginning of the Roman Empire. The end could also be dated earlier, to the time of the constitutional reforms of Julius Caesar in 49 BC.

==== Multiple crises ====
A further line of argument questions and whether it was a single coherent long crisis, proposing instead a sequence of distinct ruptures and "republics".

=== Causes ===
Early historians such as Sallust and Livy attributed the Republic’s collapse primarily to the elite's moral decay following Rome’s expansion. Appian put less emphasis on moral decline and instead traced the Republic’s instability to social and material pressures. Cicero, influential on Roman historians despite never writing a history, and on later historians due to the survival of his writing, emphasized the erosion of constitutional norms, drawing on a framework influenced by the earlier Greek historian Polybius.

During the reign of Tiberius, seventy years after Caesar's assassination, the historian Cremutius Cordus was charged with treason for having written a history too friendly to his assassins, while in the same reign the pro-Imperial historian Valerius Maximus said Brutus's memory suffered from "irreversible curses". Seneca the Younger in De Beneficiis argued that Caesar's assassins were wrong to think that the Republic could be restored, particularly under an oligarchy.

Medieval writers such as John of Salisbury and Thomas Aquinas defended tyrannicide as a moral obligation. However, Aquinas later changed his beliefs, expressing that while tyrants should be overthrown under certain circumstances, mild tyrants ought to be tolerated out of possible unintended consequences.

Although "crisis" is a common label for the political violence that saw the transition of Rome from a republic to an Empire, historians disagree over its causes. Some historians such as Ronald Syme in The Roman Revolution blame the civil wars on an escalation of elite competition viewing the late republic "as a conflict between a dominant oligarchy drawn from a set of powerful families and their opponents" which operated primarily not in ideological terms, but in terms of feuds between family-based factions. Others stress longer-term structural and socio-economic pressures. In the 1970s, Erich Gruen challenged Syme's interpretations of the Republic as institutionally weak, arguing in The Last Generation of the Roman Republic that its political system remained broadly stable until exceptional events and escalating rivalries among leading figures produced civil war.

== See also ==
- Crisis of the Third Century
- Fall of the Western Roman Empire

== Sources and further reading ==
- Abbott, Frank Frost (1963) [1901]. A History and Descriptions of Roman Political Institutions (3rd ed.). New York: Noble Offset Printers Inc.
- Börm, Henning; Gotter, Ulrich; Havener, Wolfgang (2023). A culture of Civil War? "Bellum civile" and political communication in Late Republican Rome. Stuttgart: Franz Steiner Verlag. ISBN 9783515134019.
- Brunt, Peter Astbury (1988). The fall of the Roman Republic and related essays. Oxford: Clarendon Press. ISBN 0-19-814849-6. OCLC 16466585.
- Brunt, PA (1963). "Review of "The Political Thought of Sallust" by DC Earl". The Classical Review. 13 (1): 74–75. doi:10.1017/S0009840X00216417. ISSN 0009-840X. S2CID 153649280.
- Duncan, Mike (24 October 2017). The storm before the storm: the beginning of the end of the Roman republic (1st ed.). New York: Hachette. ISBN 978-1-61039-721-6.
- Dupont, Florence (1993). Daily life in ancient Rome. Translated by Woodall, Christopher. Oxford, UK: Blackwell. ISBN 0-631-17877-5. OCLC 25788455.
- Eisenstadt, S. N.; Roniger, Luis (1984). Patrons, clients, and friends : interpersonal relations and the structure of trust in society. Cambridge: Cambridge University Press. ISBN 0-521-24687-3. OCLC 10299353.
- Fields, Nic (2009). Spartacus and the Slave War 73–71 BC : a gladiator rebels against Rome. Steve Noon. Oxford: Osprey. ISBN 978-1-84603-353-7. OCLC 320495559.
- Flower, Harriet I., ed. (2014) [2004]. The Cambridge Companion to the Roman Republic (2nd ed.). Cambridge University Press. ISBN 978-1-107-66942-0.
  - Brennan, T Corey. "Power and Process under the Republican "Constitution"". In Flower (2014), pp. 19–53.
  - von Ungern-Sternberg, Jorgen. "The Crisis of the Roman Republic". In Flower (2014), pp. 78–100.
- Flower, Harriet I. (2010). Roman republics. Princeton: Princeton University Press. ISBN 978-0-691-14043-8. OCLC 301798480.
- Gowing, Alain M (2005). Empire and Memory: the Representation of the Roman Republic in Imperial Culture. Cambridge University Press. doi:10.1017/CBO9780511610592. ISBN 0-511-12792-8. OCLC 252514679.
- Gruen, Erich S (1968). Roman politics and the criminal courts: 149–78 BC. Cambridge: Harvard University Press. LCCN 68-29179.
- Gruen, Erich S. (1995) [1974]. The Last Generation of the Roman Republic. Berkeley. ISBN 0-520-02238-6. OCLC 943848.
- Holland, Tom (2003). Rubicon : the last years of the Roman Republic (1st ed.). New York: Doubleday. ISBN 0-385-50313-X. OCLC 52878507.
- Hornblower, Simon; Spawforth, Antony, eds. (1999). The Oxford Classical Dictionary (3rd ed.). Oxford: Oxford University Press. ISBN 9780198661726.
- Lendering, Jona (2003). "Appian". Livius.org.
- Lintott, Andrew (1999). The Constitution of the Roman Republic. Oxford: Oxford University Press. ISBN 0-19-926108-3. Reprinted 2003, 2009.
- Lintott, Andrew (1994). "The Crisis of the Republic: Sources and Source-Problems". In Crook, J. A.; Lintott, Andrew; Rawson, Elizabeth (eds.). The Cambridge Ancient History, Volume IX: The Last Age of the Roman Republic, 146–43 BC. Cambridge: Cambridge University Press. pp. 1–15. doi:10.1017/CHOL9781139054379.002. ISBN 978-1-139-05437-9.
- Losch, Richard R. (2008). All the people in the Bible : an a–z guide to the saints, scoundrels, and other characters in scripture. Grand Rapids: William B. Eerdmans. ISBN 978-0-8028-2454-7. OCLC 213599663.
- Meier, Christian (1995). Caesar: a biography. David McLintock. New York: BasicBooks/HarperCollins. ISBN 0-465-00894-1. OCLC 33246109.
- Meier, Christian (1997). Res publica amissa: eine Studie zu Verfassung und Geschichte der späten römischen Republik (in German). Suhrkamp. ISBN 978-3-518-57506-2.
- Polybius (1823). The General History of Polybius: Translated from the Greek. Vol. 2 (Fifth ed.). Oxford: Printed by W. Baxter.
- Reilly, John J. (26 December 2019). "The Long View: The Last Generation of the Roman Republic by Erich S. Gruen". With Both Hands. Benespen.
- Ridley, R. T. (2016). "The Fall of the Roman Republic". Agora. 51 (1): 66.
- Robb, M. A. (2010). Beyond Populares and Optimates: Political Language in the Late Republic. Steiner. ISBN 978-3-515-09643-0.
- Santangelo, Federico (2021). "The Crisis of the Roman Republic: Archaeology of a Concept". Historika. 11. Franz Steiner Verlag: 301–478.
- Seager, Robin, ed. (1969). The crisis of the Roman republic : studies in political and social history. Cambridge: Heffer. ISBN 0-85270-024-5. OCLC 28921.
  - Brunt, Peter Astbury. "The Equites in the Late Republic". In Seager (1969), pp. 83-117.
- Spaeth, Barbette (1996). The Roman Goddess Ceres. U. of Texas Press. ISBN 0-292-77693-4.
- Steel, Catherine (2014). "The Roman Senate and the post-Sullan res publica". Historia: Zeitschrift für Alte Geschichte. 63 (3): 328.
- Straumann, Benjamin (2016). Crisis and Constitutionalism: Roman Political Thought from the Late Republic to the Age of Augustus. Oxford University Press. ISBN 9781107082496.
- Strauss, Barry S. (2009). The Spartacus war (1st ed.). New York: Simon & Schuster. ISBN 978-1-4165-3205-7. OCLC 232979141.
- Syme, Ronald (1939). The Roman Revolution (1960 ed.).
- Syme, Ronald (1999) [1939]. The provincial at Rome: and, Rome and the Balkans 80 BC – AD 14. Anthony Birley. University of Exeter Press. ISBN 0-85989-632-3. OCLC 59407034.
- Tempest, Kathryn (2017). Brutus: The Noble Conspirator. London: Yale University Press. ISBN 978-0-300-18009-1.
- Wiedemann, Thomas E. J. (1994). Cicero and the end of the Roman Republic. London: Bristol Classical Press. ISBN 1-85399-193-7. OCLC 31494651.
- Williams, Guy (2015). "The Historiography of the Late Roman Republic". Saber and Scroll. 4 (2): 57–67.
- Wiseman, T. P. (2009). Remembering the Roman people : essays on late-Republican politics and literature. Oxford: Oxford Univ. Press. ISBN 978-0-19-156750-6. OCLC 328101074.
