= Erich S. Gruen =

American classicist and historian (born 1935)

- Born: May 7, 1935 (age 91); Vienna, Austria
- Occupations: Classicist, historian
- Awards: Guggenheim Fellowship (1969, 1989)

Academic background
- Education: Columbia University; Merton College, Oxford; Harvard University

Academic work
- Sub-discipline: Classical history
- Institutions: University of California, Berkeley
- Notable students: Kenneth Sacks; Josephine Crawley Quinn
- Notable works: The Last Generation of the Roman Republic

Erich Stephen Gruen (/ˈɡruːən/ GROO-ən, German: [ˈɡʁuːən]; born May 7, 1935) is an American classicist and ancient historian. He was the Gladys Rehard Wood Professor of History and Classics at the University of California, Berkeley, where he taught full-time from 1966 until 2008. He served as president of the American Philological Association in 1992.

== Early life and education ==
Gruen was born May 7, 1935, in Vienna, to a Jewish family. He received BAs from Columbia University and Oxford University and a PhD from Harvard University in 1964. Gruen was a varsity lightweight rower at Columbia and valedictorian of his 550-man graduating class. From 1957 to 1960, he was a Rhodes Scholar at Merton College, Oxford.

== Career ==
His early work focused on the late Roman Republic and culminated in The Last Generation of the Roman Republic, a work often cited as a response to Ronald Syme's The Roman Revolution. Gruen's argument is that the Republic was not in decay, and so not necessarily in need of "rescue" by Caesar Augustus and the institutions of the Empire. He later worked on the Hellenistic period and on Judaism in the classical world.

Gruen taught what was purportedly his final undergraduate lecture course, "The Hellenistic World", in the fall of 2006. Despite his retirement from full-time teaching, he continued to oversee doctoral dissertations and was widely sought for visiting professorships. In addition to U.C. Berkeley, Gruen has taught at Harvard University, the University of Colorado Boulder, and Cornell University. He said that his most inspirational teaching experience, however, was a brief stint instructing prisoners at San Quentin State Prison in the late 2000s. At Berkeley, his students included Kenneth Sacks.

Gruen received two Guggenheim Fellowships, 1969–70 and 1989–90. He received the Austrian Cross of Honour for Science and Art in 1998.

On September 26–27, 2024, the University of California at Berkeley held a two-day conference "to commemorate the 50th anniversary of the 1974 publication of Erich Gruen's landmark study, The Last Generation of the Roman Republic".

== Books ==
- Roman politics and the criminal courts, 149–78 BC. Cambridge, MA: Harvard University Press. 1968. doi:10.4159/harvard.9780674284210. ISBN 978-0-674-28421-0. (Reviewed by Wiseman, T P (1970). Journal of Roman Studies. 60: 212f. JSTOR 299430.)
- The Last Generation of the Roman Republic. Berkeley, CA: University of California Press. 1974. ISBN 0-520-02238-6. LCCN 72-89244.
- The Hellenistic world and the coming of Rome. Berkeley, CA: University of California Press. 1986. ISBN 978-0-520-05737-1.
- Culture and national identity in Republican Rome. Cornell Studies in Classical Philology. Ithaca, NY: Cornell University Press. 1994. ISBN 978-0-8014-8041-6. (Reviewed by Forsythe, Gary (1994). Bryn Mawr Classical Review. 1994.02.11.)
- Heritage and Hellenism: the reinvention of Jewish tradition. Hellenistic Culture and Society. University of California Press. 2002. ISBN 978-0-520-23506-9.
- Diaspora: Jews amidst Greeks and Romans. Harvard University Press. 2004. doi:10.4159/9780674037991. ISBN 978-0-674-03799-1. (Reviewed by Robinson, Tom (2002). Bryn Mawr Classical Review. 2002.10.33.)
- Rethinking the other in antiquity. Martin Classical Lectures. Princeton University Press. 2010. ISBN 978-0-691-14852-6.
- Construct of identity in Hellenistic Judaism. De Gruyter. 2016. doi:10.1515/9783110375558. ISBN 978-3-11-037555-8.
- Scriptural Tales Retold: The Inventiveness of Second Temple Jews. Jewish and Christian Texts In Context and Related Studies. T&T Clark. 2024. ISBN 978-0567715173.
