= Faculty of Classics =

A Faculty of Classics may be focused on ancient history, culture and ancient literature. The title may refer to the following faculties:

- Faculty of Classics, University of Cambridge
- Faculty of Classics, University of Oxford
