= Paul Cartledge =

British ancient Greece historian (born 1947)

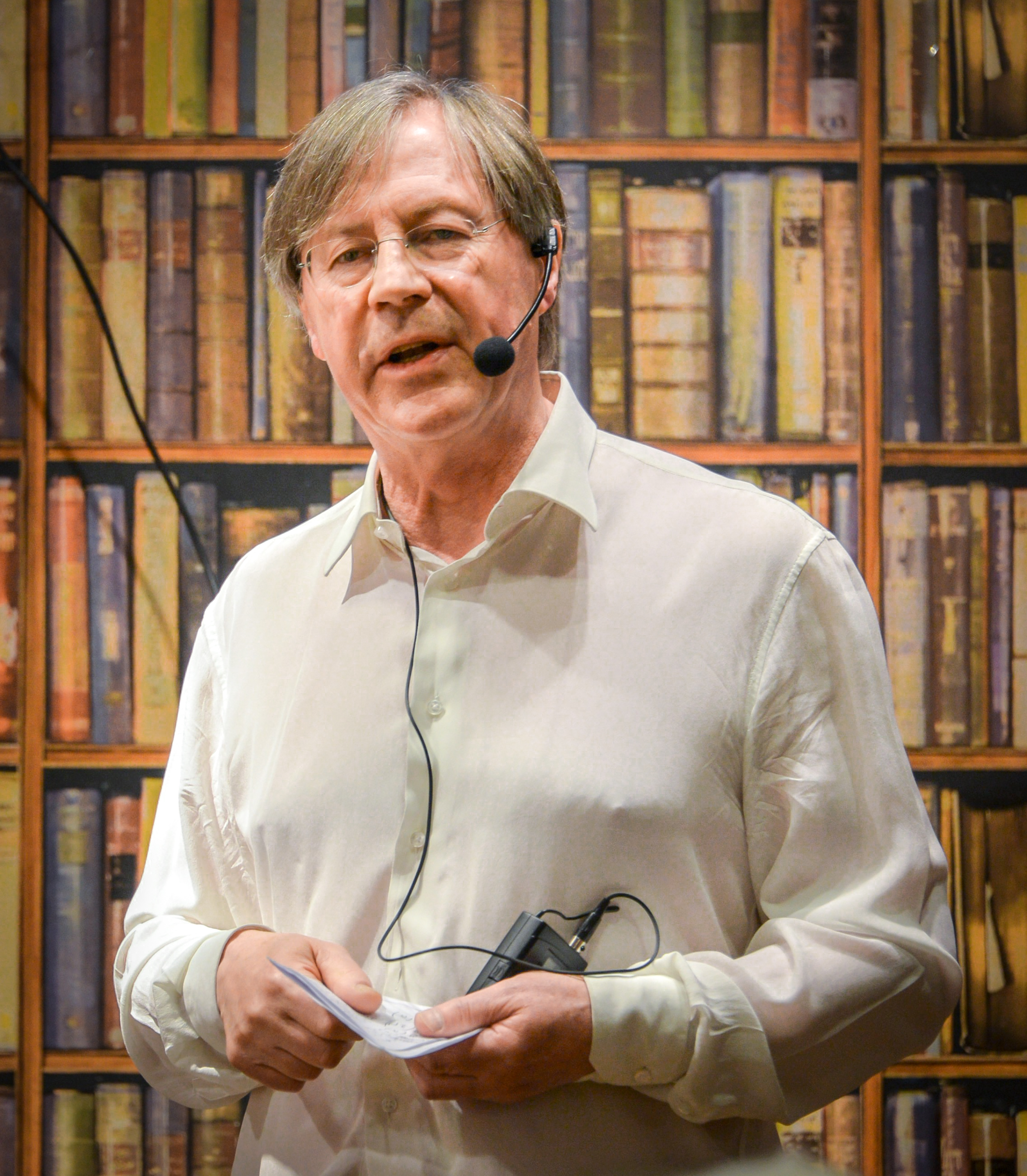
- Cartledge in Stockholm 2014 due to his books Alexander the Great and The Spartans: An Epic History
- Born: Paul Anthony Cartledge; 24 March 1947 (age 79)

Academic background
- Education: New College, Oxford (MA, DPhil)
- Doctoral advisor: John Boardman

Academic work
- Discipline: Ancient history
- Sub-discipline: Ancient Greece
- Institutions: New University of Ulster; Trinity College, Dublin; University of Warwick; Clare College, Cambridge; Faculty of Classics, University of Cambridge

Paul Anthony Cartledge (born in London on 24 March 1947) is a British ancient historian and academic. From 2008 to 2014, he was the A. G. Leventis Professor of Greek Culture at the University of Cambridge. He had previously held a personal chair in Greek history at Cambridge. He is currently Emeritus A. G. Leventis Professor of Greek Culture at the University of Cambridge and a Global Distinguished Professor at NYU.

== Early life ==
Cartledge was educated at St Paul's School and New College, Oxford, where, with his contemporaries Robin Lane Fox and Terence Irwin, he was a student of G. E. M. de Ste. Croix. He graduated with a Bachelor of Arts degree, later promoted to MA (Oxon) by seniority, in 1969. He remained at the University of Oxford to undertake postgraduate studies, completing a Doctor of Philosophy (DPhil) under the supervision of Professor Sir John Boardman. His thesis focused on Spartan archaeology.

== Academic career ==
Cartledge lectured at the New University of Ulster in 1972–73, at Trinity College, Dublin, from 1973 to 1978, and at the University of Warwick in 1978–79. In October 1979, he moved to Cambridge University where he is a fellow of Clare College.

In 2008, Cartledge was elected to the newly established A. G. Leventis Professorship of Greek Culture at Cambridge University, a position from which he retired at the end of September 2014.

Cartledge holds a visiting Global Distinguished Professorship at New York University, funded by the Greek Parliament, and sits on the European Advisory Board of Princeton University Press.

Cartledge is also a holder of the Gold Cross of the Order of Honour of Greece and an Honorary Citizen of (modern) Sparta.

He is Vice-Chair of the British Committee for the Reunification of the Parthenon Marbles.

== Field of study ==
Cartledge's field of study is Athens and Sparta in the Classical Age; he has been described as a Laconophile.

He was chief historical consultant for the BBC TV series The Greeks and the Channel 4 series The Spartans, presented by Bettany Hughes.

Cartledge has appeared several times over his career on the BBC radio program In Our Time on episodes that discuss the ancient world.

== Personal life ==
Cartledge is married to Judith Portrait, a solicitor who acts as trustee of part of the Sainsbury family shareholding in Sainsbury's in blind trust.

In August 2014, Cartledge was one of 200 public figures who were signatories to a letter to The Guardian opposing Scottish independence in the run-up to September's referendum on that issue.

== Publications ==
- Agesilaos and the Crisis of Sparta (1987), The Johns Hopkins University Press. ISBN 9780801835056
- Aristophanes and His Theatre of the Absurd (1989), Duckworth. ISBN 1-85399-114-7
- Nomos : Essays in Athenian Law, Politics and Society (1991), Cambridge University Press. ISBN 0-521-37022-1
- The Cambridge Illustrated History of Ancient Greece (1997), Cambridge University Press.
- The Greeks: Crucible of Civilization (TV Books, L.L.C., 2000; BBC Worldwide, 2001; 2nd ed. Oxford University Press, 2002)
- Spartan Reflections, a collection of essays new and revised (Duckworth, 2001), ISBN 0-7156-2966-2
- Sparta and Lakonia (2nd edn., Routledge and Kegan Paul, 2002).
- Hellenistic and Roman Sparta (rev. edn., Routledge, 2002), (with A. Spawforth).
- The Greeks: A Portrait of Self and Others (2nd edn, Oxford University Press, 2002), the product of research into Greek self-definition.
- Kosmos: Essays in Order, Conflict and Community in Classical Athens (coauthor Paul Millett; (2002), Cambridge University Press. ISBN 0-521-52593-4
- The Spartans: An Epic History (2nd edition, Pan Books, 2003). Published in the U.S. by The Overlook Press/Peter Mayer Publishers as The Spartans: The World of the Warrior-Heroes of Ancient Greece, from Utopia to Crisis and Collapse (2003) ISBN 1-58567-402-8.
- Alexander the Great: The Hunt for a New Past (Macmillan, 2004).
- Helots and Their Masters in Laconia and Messenia: Histories, Ideologies, Structures (Center for Hellenic Studies, 2004). ISBN 0-674-01223-2
- Thermopylae: The Battle That Changed the World (The Overlook Press, 2006). ISBN 1-58567-566-0
- Ancient Greek Political Thought in Practice (Cambridge University Press, 2009). ISBN 978-0-521-45455-1
- Ancient Greece: A History in Eleven Cities, (Oxford University Press, 2009). ISBN 978-0-191-57157-2
- Democracy: A Life (Oxford University Press, 2016). ISBN 978-0-199-83745-8
- Thebes: The Forgotten City of Ancient Greece (Picador, 2020). ISBN 978-1509873166

Academic offices
Preceded by None: new position	A. G. Leventis Professor of Greek Culture at Cambridge University; 2008 – 2014	Succeeded by Tim Whitmarsh
