= John Robert Martindale =

British historian (born 1935)

John Robert Martindale (born 1935) is a British historian specializing in the later Roman and Byzantine empires. Martindale's major publications are his magnum opus, the Prosopography of the Later Roman Empire, begun by A. H. M. Jones and published between 1971 and 1992, and the first part of Prosopography of the Byzantine Empire, which was published in 2001.

== Early life and education ==
Born in 1935, Martindale was educated at Brasenose College, Oxford, where in 1958 he graduated with a Bachelor of Arts in Literae Humaniores, later promoted to MA, and then in 1961 with a Bachelor of Letters. His dissertation was entitled "Public disorders in the late Roman Empire, their causes and character".

In 1960, Martindale's supervisor was A. H. M. Jones, Professor of Ancient History at Cambridge, and as Martindale approached the conclusion of his B.Litt. work Jones invited him to assist in his ongoing Roman prosopography project, originally conceived by Theodor Mommsen. Martindale accepted and began work as Jones's assistant later the same year, joining John Morris, another of Jones's former pupils.

== Academic career ==
After his final graduation at Oxford, in 1961 Martindale migrated to Jesus College, Cambridge, where he incorporated as a Cambridge MA and was appointed as a Senior Researcher in Classics, continuing in that post until 1971. Jones noted in 1964 that Martindale had already by then checked all the dates and references to the Codex Theodosianus, the Codex Justinianus, and the Novels of Theodosius II, "an accomplishment that would surely qualify as a worthy contender for the thirteenth labour of Hercules".

Greater responsibility fell on Martindale with the death of Professor Jones in 1970. Thereafter, he focussed increasingly on leading the prosopography projects, with funding from the British Academy. Morris continued to work on the project until his death in 1977, but also had other interests, especially in Arthurian studies.

Most of Martindale's work in the 1970s and 1980s was on the second and third volumes of Prosopography of the Later Roman Empire, describing the common characteristics of groups of people within the Empire between the years 395 and 641 AD, which is from the reign of Honorius up to that of Heraclius. The years from 260 to 395 AD (Gallienus to Theodosius I) had been dealt with in the first volume, published in March 1971, and Martindale had begun preliminary work on the second volume in 1969. A large team of scholars was employed to read the authors of the period and draw excerpts from them.

After the publication of the third volume, Michael Whitby noted that the Prosopography of the Later Roman Empire was "a project which was initiated by Jones and seen through, in considerably expanded form, to improvement and completion by John Martindale".

Martindale then proceeded to the Byzantine world, and Volume 1 of Prosopography of the Byzantine Empire was published on a compact disc in 2001.

== Major publications ==
- Prosopography of the Later Roman Empire, ed. with A. H. M. Jones (1904–1970) and John Morris (1913–1977):
  - Volume 1, from 260 to 395 AD (Cambridge University Press, 1971, ISBN 978-0521072335), in two volumes
  - Volume 2, from 395 to 527 AD (Cambridge University Press, 1980, ISBN 978-0521201599), in two volumes
  - Volume 3, from 527 to 641 AD (Cambridge University Press, 1992, ISBN 978-0521201605), in two volumes
- Prosopography of the Byzantine Empire
  - Volume 1, from 641 to 847 AD (Ashgate compact disc, 2001, ISBN 978-0754606130)

== Minor publications ==
- J. R. Martindale, "Note on the Consuls of 381 and 382" in Historia: Zeitschrift für Alte Geschichte 16, H2 (April 1967), pp. 254–256
- J. R. Martindale, "Western Aristocracies and Imperial Court A. D. 364–425 By JOHN MATTHEWS", review for The Journal of Theological Studies XXVII, Issue 1 (April 1976), pp. 226–229
- J. R. Martindale, "R. von Haehling, Die Religionszugehörigkeit der hohen Amtsträger des Römischen Reiches Seit Constantins I. Alleinherrschaft bis zum Ende der Theodosianischen Dynastie (324–450 BZW. 455 N. CHR.) (Antiquitas, Reihe III, XXIII). Bonn: Habelt, 1978", review for Journal of Roman Studies 69 (November 1979), pp. 194–196
- J. R. Martindale, "H. C. Teitler, Notarii and Exceptores: an Inquiry into Role and Significance of Shorthand Writers in the Imperial and Ecclesiastical Bureaucracy of the Roman Empire (from the Early Principate to c. 450 A.D.) (Dutch monographs on ancient history and archaeology 1). Amsterdam: Gieben, 1985", review for Journal of Roman Studies 77 (November 1987), pp. 203–204
- J. R. Martindale, "Roger S. Bagnall, Alan Cameron, Seth R. Schwartz, Klaas A. Worp, Consuls of the Later Roman Empire (Philological monographs of the American Philological Association XXXVI). Atlanta: Scholars Press, 1987", review for Journal of Roman Studies 79 (November 1989), pp. 254–255
