= Robin Osborne =

British archaeologist (born 1957)

Robin Osborne FBA
- Born: 11 March 1957 (age 69)
- Citizenship: United Kingdom

Academic background
- Education: Colchester Royal Grammar School
- Alma mater: King's College, Cambridge

Academic work
- Discipline: Ancient history
- Sub-discipline: Ancient Greece; Archaic Greece; Ancient Greek art; Ancient Greek law
- Institutions: King's College, Cambridge; Magdalen College, Oxford; Corpus Christi College, Oxford; Faculty of Classics, University of Cambridge

Robin Grimsey Osborne FBA (born 11 March 1957) is an English historian of classical antiquity, who is particularly interested in Ancient Greece.

== Early life ==
He grew up in Little Bromley, attending Little Bromley County Primary School and then Colchester Royal Grammar School. He was an undergraduate at King's College, Cambridge, where he also took a PhD degree.

== Academic career ==
From 1982 to 1986 Osborne was a Junior Unofficial Fellow at King's College, Cambridge. In 1986 he moved to Oxford University, initially as a three-year fixed term Fellow at Magdalen College before in 1989 being appointed a University Lecturer in Ancient History and a Fellow of Corpus Christi College.

In 2001 Osborne returned to Cambridge to take up the position of Professor of Ancient History and was appointed a Fellow of King's College. He was elected a Fellow of the British Academy (FBA) in 2006. In the same year he was elected chair of the Council of University Classical Departments for a three-year term; in 2009 he was re-elected for a second and final term of office.

He was President of the Society for the Promotion of Hellenic Studies, 2002–2006. Osborne serves as the executive editor for World Archaeology, an academic journal published by Routledge, and is a member of the editorial boards of several other renowned journals including the Journal of Hellenic Studies, the Journal of Mediterranean Archaeology and the American Journal of Archaeology. Since 2016, Osborne has been the Vice-Chair of Council of the British School at Athens. Osborne is the Chair of the Faculty Board of the Cambridge University Faculty of Classics.

Osborne is the author of textbooks on archaic Greek history (Greece in the Making 1200–479 BC) and on Greek art (Archaic and Classical Greek Art); he has also written numerous seminal articles on Athenian law, ancient Greek social and economic history, and Classical art and archaeology. In 2019, he was joint winner of the Runciman Award for his book The Transformation of Athens: Painted Pottery and the Creation of Classical Greece.

== Bibliography of works ==
- Osborne, Robin (1985). Demos: the discovery of classical Attika. (1985). Cambridge: Cambridge University Press.
- Osborne, Robin (1987). Classical landscape with figures. The ancient Greek city and its countryside. London: George Philip.
- Osborne, Robin; Alcock, Susan E. (1994). Placing the gods: sanctuaries and sacred space in ancient Greece. Oxford: Clarendon Press. ISBN 0-19-815060-1.
- Osborne, Robin (1996). Greece in the making, 1200-479 BC. New York: Routledge. ISBN 0-415-03583-X.
- Osborne, Robin (1998). Archaic and classical Greek art. Oxford: Oxford University Press. ISBN 0-19-284202-1.
- Osborne, Robin; Goldhill, Simon (1999). Performance culture and Athenian democracy. Cambridge: Cambridge University Press. ISBN 0-521-64247-7.
- Osborne, Robin; Rhodes, P. J. (2003). Greek historical inscriptions: 404-323 BC. Oxford: Oxford University Press. ISBN 0-19-815313-9.
- Osborne, Robin (2007). Debating the Athenian cultural revolution. Cambridge: Cambridge University Press. ISBN 978-0-521-87916-3.
- Osborne, Robin (2014). Greek History: The Basics. Routledge. ISBN 978-0415644648.
- Eidinow, Esther; Kindt, Julia; Osborne, Robin, eds. (2016). Theologies of Ancient Greek Religion. Cambridge: Cambridge University Press. ISBN 978-1107153479.
- Osborne, Robin (2018). The Transformation of Athens: Painted Pottery and the Creation of Classical Greece (Martin Classical Lectures). Woodstock, England: Princeton University Press. p. 304. ISBN 978-0-691-17767-0.
- Osborne, Robin (2023). The Oxford History of the Archaic Greek World: Volume II: Athens and Attica. Oxford University Press.

Academic offices
Preceded by Keith Hopkins	Professor of Ancient History, Cambridge University; 2001–2025	Succeeded by Josephine Crawley Quinn
