= Keith Hopkins =

British historian and sociologist

Morris Keith Hopkins, FBA (London, 20 June 1934–London, 8 March 2004), was a British historian and sociologist. He was professor of ancient history at the University of Cambridge from 1985 to 2000.

Hopkins had a relatively unconventional route to the Cambridge professorship. After Brentwood School, he graduated in classics at King's College, Cambridge in 1958. He spent time as a graduate student, much influenced by Moses Finley, but left before completing his doctorate for an assistant lectureship in sociology at the University of Leicester (1961–1963).

Hopkins returned to Cambridge as a research fellow at King's College, Cambridge (1963–1967), while at the same time taking a lectureship at the London School of Economics, before spending two years as professor of sociology at Hong Kong University (1967–1969). After a further two years at the LSE (1970–1972), he moved to Brunel University as professor of sociology in 1972, also serving as dean of the social sciences faculty from 1981 to 1985. He is best known for the book Conquerors and Slaves, in which he argued that historians of antiquity need not submit to the sources they studied, demanding instead that those sources be questioned and understood within their larger context. His rethinking of traditionalist methodology, and disagreement with the traditionalist Fergus Millar, makes him one of the most influential twentieth-century ancient historians.

In 1985, Hopkins was elected to the Cambridge Chair in Ancient History. The fullest account of his career and significance as an ancient historian is in his British Academy obituary.

== Publications ==
Books

- Conquerors and Slaves (1978)
- Death and Renewal (1983)
- A World Full of Gods (1999)
- Rome The Cosmopolis (2002), a volume of essays written in honour of Keith Hopkins
- The Colosseum (2005), co-authored with Mary Beard
- Sociological Studies in Roman History (2017), a collection of previously published articles, edited by Christopher Kelly

Academic offices
Preceded by	Professor of Sociology, Brunel University; 1972–1985	Succeeded by
Preceded by John Crook	Professor of Ancient History, Cambridge University; 1985–2000	Succeeded by Robin Osborne
