= Serafina Cuomo =

Italian historian (born 1966)

Dr Serafina Cuomo
- Born: May 21, 1966 (age 60)
- Education: University of Naples (B.A.); University of Cambridge (PhD)

Serafina Cuomo (born May 21, 1966) is an Italian historian, specialising in ancient mathematics and the history of technology. Since 2024, she has served as the A. G. Leventis Professor of Greek Culture at the University of Cambridge.

== Education ==
Cuomo achieved a bachelor's degree in Philosophy at the University of Naples. She received a doctorate in History and Philosophy of Science from the University of Cambridge in 1995, with a PhD thesis titled "The ghost of mathematicians past: tradition and innovation in Pappus' Collectio Mathematica".

== Career ==
Cuomo has published on topics in ancient mathematics, including computing practices in ancient Rome and the mathematician Pappus of Alexandria, and the history of technology.

Cuomo formerly worked as a lecturer at Imperial College London, Birkbeck University of London, and Durham University. In March 2024, she was elected A. G. Leventis Professor of Greek Culture at the University of Cambridge, taking up the post from September 2024.

In 2019, Cuomo participated in the EHESS (École des Hautes Etudes en Sciences Sociales).

== Books ==
- Pappus of Alexandria and the Mathematics of Late Antiquity (Cambridge Classical Studies, Cambridge University Press, 2000)
- Ancient Mathematics (Sciences of Antiquity, Routledge, 2001)
- Technology and Culture in Greek and Roman Antiquity (Key Themes in Ancient History, Cambridge University Press, 2007)

== Articles and chapters ==
- “Skills and virtues in Vitruvius’ book 10”, in M. Formisano (ed.), War in Words, Leiden: Brill 2011, 309-32
- “All the proconsul’s men: Cicero, Verres and account-keeping”, Annali dell’Università degli studi di Napoli ‘L’ Orientale’. Sezione filologico-letteraria. Quaderni 15, Naples 2011, 165-85
- “A Roman engineer’s tales”, Journal of Roman Studies 101 (2011), 143-65
- “Measures for an emperor: Volusius Maecianus’ monetary pamphlet for Marcus Aurelius”, in J. König & T. Whitmarsh (eds.), Ordering Knowledge in the Roman Empire, Cambridge University Press 2007, 206-228
- “The machine and the city: Hero of Alexandria's Belopoeica”, in C. J. Tuplin & T. E. Rihll (eds.), Science and Mathematics in Ancient Greek Culture, Oxford: Oxford University Press 2002, 165-77
- “Divide and rule: Frontinus and Roman land-surveying”, Studies in History and Philosophy of Science 31 (2000), 189-202
- “Shooting by the book: Notes on Tartaglia's ‘Scientia Nova’”, History of Science 35 (1997), 155-88

Academic offices
Preceded by Tim Whitmarsh	A. G. Leventis Professor of Greek Culture at Cambridge University; 2024–	Succeeded by incumbent
