= Barbette Spaeth =

American academic

Barbette Stanley Spaeth is an American academic who is an associate professor at College of William and Mary, and is an expert in Roman mythology. She is a former secretary of the Williamsburg Society, Archaeological Institute of America, and president of the Society for Ancient Mediterranean Religions.

She graduated from Johns Hopkins University with a PhD.

Spaeth wrote her doctoral dissertation on The Roman Goddess Ceres. She was a professor at Tulane University, from 1987 to 2001.

She has won awards for her work in academia.

== Selected publications ==
- Spaeth, Barbette Stanley, "The Goddess Ceres and the Death of Tiberius Gracchus", Historia: Zeitschrift für Alte Geschichte, Vol. 39, No. 2, 1990.
- Spaeth, Barbette Stanley (1996). The Roman goddess Ceres. University of Texas Press. ISBN 978-0-292-77693-7.

== See also ==
- Aventine Triad
- Cerealia
- Crisis of the Roman Republic
- Enna
- Liber and Libera (mythology)
- Mother goddess
- Sexuality in ancient Rome
- Women in ancient Rome
