= Moses Finley =

American-born British academic (1912–1986)

Sir Moses Finley FBA
- Born: Moses Israel Finkelstein; 20 May 1912; New York City, U.S.
- Died: 23 June 1986 (aged 74); Cambridge, England
- Spouse: Mary Moscowitz (m. 1932; died 1986)

Academic background
- Education: Syracuse University; Columbia University

Academic work
- Discipline: Classics
- Sub-discipline: Ancient History; Ancient Greece; Economy of ancient Greece; Roman economy
- School or tradition: Frankfurt School
- Institutions: Columbia University; City College of New York; Rutgers University; Jesus College, Cambridge; Faculty of Classics, University of Cambridge; Darwin College, Cambridge
- Doctoral students: Paul Millett

Sir Moses Israel Finley FBA (born Finkelstein; 20 May 1912 – 23 June 1986) was an American-born British academic and classical scholar. His prosecution by the United States Senate Subcommittee on Internal Security during the 1950s resulted in his relocation to England, where he became an English classical scholar and eventually master of Darwin College, Cambridge. His most notable publication is The Ancient Economy (1973), in which he argued that the economy in antiquity was governed by status and civic ideology rather than rational economic motivations.

== Personal life ==
Finley was born in 1912 in New York City to Nathan Finkelstein and Anna Katzenellenbogen. About 1946, he adopted the surname Finley. He was educated at Syracuse University, where, aged fifteen, he graduated magna cum laude in psychology, and at Columbia University. Although his M.A. was in public law, most of his published work concerned ancient history, especially the social and economic aspects of the classical world.

In 1932 Finley married Mary (née Moscowitz, who later changed to her mother's surname, Thiers), a schoolteacher, and the two enjoyed a happy and mutually reinforcing marriage. On the day of her death he suffered a cerebral haemorrhage, and he died the following day on 23 June 1986 at Addenbrooke's Hospital, Cambridge. The New York Times obituary adds: "He had suffered a stroke the previous day, an hour after learning of the death of his wife."

== Career ==
=== United States ===
Finley taught at Columbia University and City College of New York, where he was influenced by members of the Frankfurt School who were working in exile in America. He then taught at Rutgers University.

On 5 September 1951, an ex-communist, Karl Wittfogel, testified before the House Un-American Activities Committee that Finley was a communist. On 28 March 1952, Finley appeared before the committee and invoked the Fifth Amendment regarding his association with communism. On 7 September 1952, Lewis Webster Jones, the president of Rutgers University, announced his intention to appoint Trustee and Faculty Committees to review the cases of professors involved in government inquiries. On 15 November 1952, FBI Director J. Edgar Hoover met with Jones to discuss the cases. On 12 December 1952, Rutger's Board of Trustees resolution declared, "It shall be cause for immediate dismissal of any member of faculty or staff" to fail to co-operate with government inquiries. On 31 December 1952, Rutgers dismissed Finley. Rutgers University records show:

On 3 December 1952, the Special Faculty Committee issued a report stating there should be no charges against Heimlich or Finley and that the University should take no further action in the matter. However, the Trustees, who had the final say in the matter, issued a resolution on 12 December 1952: "it shall be cause for immediate dismissal of any member of faculty or staff" who invokes the Fifth Amendment before an investigatory body in refusing to answer questions relating to communist affiliations and that Professors Heimlich and Finley would be dismissed as of December of 31, 1952 unless they conformed to the new policy. Neither chose to do so. There was protest at the decision by members of the faculty, who formed an Emergency Committee on the matter.

In 1954, he appeared before the United States Senate Subcommittee on Internal Security, which asked him whether he had ever been a member of the Communist Party USA. He again invoked the Fifth Amendment and refused to answer.

=== Britain ===
Finley immigrated to Britain, where he was appointed university lecturer in classics at Cambridge (1955–1964) and, during 1957, elected to a fellowship at Jesus College. He was reader of ancient social and economic history (1964–1970), professor of ancient history (1970–1979) and master of Darwin College (1976–1982). He gave the 1974 Mortimer Wheeler Archaeological Lecture.

He broadened the scope of classical studies from philology to culture, economics, and society. He became a British subject in 1962, and a Fellow of the British Academy in 1971, and was knighted by Queen Elizabeth II in 1979. He was a doctoral adviser to Paul Millett, now a senior lecturer in classics at the University of Cambridge.

== Work ==
Among his works, The World of Odysseus (1954, revised ed. with additional essays 1978) proved seminal. In it, he applied the findings of ethnologists and anthropologists like Marcel Mauss to interpret Homer, a radical method that was thought by his publishers to require a reassuring introduction by an established classicist, Maurice Bowra. Paul Cartledge asserted in 1995, "... in retrospect Finley's work can be seen as the seed of the present flowering of anthropologically-related studies of ancient Greek culture and society".

Following the example of Karl Polanyi, Finley argued that the ancient economy should not be analysed using the concepts of modern economic science, because ancient man had no notion of the economy as a separate part of society, and because economic actions in antiquity were determined not primarily by economic, but by social concerns. This text was later criticised by, amongst others, Kevin Greene, who argues that Finley underplays the importance of technological innovation, and C. R. Whittaker, who rejects the concept of a "consumer city".

=== Bibliography ===
- Studies in Land and Credit in Ancient Athens, 500–200 B.C.: The Horos Inscriptions (1951).
- Economy and Society in Ancient Greece (1953).
- The World of Odysseus (1954).
- Aspects of Antiquity: Discoveries and Controversies (1960).
- The Ancient Greeks: An Introduction to Their Life and Thought (1963).
- A History of Sicily: with Denis Mack Smith (3 vols., 1968).
  - Ancient Sicily to the Arab Conquest, vol. 1
  - Medieval Sicily - 800-1713, vol. 2
  - Modern Sicily - After 1713, vol. 3
- Aspects of Antiquity: Discoveries and Controversies (1968).
- Early Greece: The Bronze and Archaic Ages (1970).
- The Ancient Economy (1973).
- Democracy Ancient and Modern (1973).
- Studies in Ancient Society, editor (1974).
- The Use and Abuse of History (1975).
- Schliemann's Troy: One Hundred Years After (1975).
- Studies in Roman Property, editor (1976).
- The Olympic Games: The First Thousand Years, with H.W. Pleket (1976).
- Ancient Slavery and Modern Ideology (1980; expanded edition edited by Brent D. Shaw, 1998).
- Economy and Society in Ancient Greece (1981, B.D. Shaw and R.P. Saller, eds.)
- The Legacy of Greece: A New Appraisal (1981).
- Authority and Legitimacy in the Classical City-State (1982).
- Politics in the Ancient World (1983).
- Ancient History: Evidence and Models (1985).
- A History of Sicily, with Denis Mack Smith & Christopher Duggan (1986; abridged from the 1968 edition).

Finley was also the editor of numerous volumes of essays on ancient history.

== See also ==
- Morris U. Cohen
- Jack D. Foner
- Morris Schappes
- Rapp-Coudert Committee

== Notes ==
Academic offices
| Preceded by A. H. M. Jones | Professor of Ancient History, Cambridge University; 1970–1979 | Succeeded by John Anthony Crook |
| Preceded by Frank George Young | Master of Darwin College, Cambridge; 1976–1982 | Succeeded by Arnold Burgen |
