= Kenneth Sacks =

American historian and classicist

Kenneth Sacks is an American historian and classicist, noted for his work on Ralph Waldo Emerson. Currently he serves as Professor of History and Classics at Brown University, where he was previously Dean of the College.

A graduate of the University of Pittsburgh, Sacks received his PhD from the University of California, Berkeley, where he studied under Erich S. Gruen and Raphael Sealey. He then taught at the University of Wisconsin–Madison until 1995, when he joined Brown as Dean of the College. The author of two books on Greek historians, Polybius on the Writing of History (1981) and Diodorus Siculus and the First Century (1990, a Choice "Outstanding Academic Book of 1991), he is most recently the author of Understanding Emerson: "The American Scholar" and His Struggle for Self-Reliance (2003). Sacks is additionally the editor of the volume on Emerson for the Cambridge Texts in History of Political Thought.
