= The Last Generation of the Roman Republic =

1974 scholarly text by Erich S. Gruen

The Last Generation of the Roman Republic (1974) is a scholarly work by Erich S. Gruen on the end of the Roman Republic in the 1st century BC.

The central argument of the work is that the Late Roman Republic can be characterised by the strength and continuity of its institutions, rather than by their gradual disintegration. The latter view, first presented in Ronald Syme's influential The Roman Revolution (1939), was popularly accepted prior to Gruen's The Last Generation, and this work is often considered a reply to Syme.

== Sources ==
- Crawford, M. H. (1976). "Review: Hamlet without the Prince". The Classical Review. 26 (2): 309–310. JSTOR 299790.
- Gruen, Erich S (1974). The last generation of the Roman republic. Berkeley, CA: University of California Press. ISBN 0-520-02238-6. LCCN 72-89244.
- Lintott, A.W. (October 1976). "The Last Generation of the Roman Republic". The Classical Review. New Series. 26 (2): 241–243. doi:10.1017/S0009840X00248531. JSTOR 713099.
- Reilly, John J. (26 December 2019). "The Long View: The Last Generation of the Roman Republic by Erich S. Gruen". With Both Hands. Benespen.
