= How the World Made the West =

2024 book by Josephine Quinn

How the World Made the West: A 4,000 Year History
- Author: Josephine Crawley Quinn
- Language: English
- Publisher: Bloomsbury Publishing
- Publication date: 29 February 2024
- Publication place: United Kingdom
- Pages: 576
- ISBN: 9781526605184

How the World Made the West: A 4,000-Year History is a 2024 work of global ancient history by Irish historian Josephine Quinn. The book presents the West as the cumulative result of long-term exchanges across Africa, Asia, and Europe, rather than a self-contained Greco-Roman lineage and argues—through case studies drawn from c. 2000 BCE to c. 1500 CE—those ideas, technologies, and institutions commonly labeled Western emerged through sustained interconnection and borrowing.

== Synopsis ==
The book argues that Western civilisation emerged from long-running connections across the Mediterranean, Middle East, Africa, and Eurasia rather than from Greece and Rome alone. It highlights how Europe was often peripheral to broader networks of exchange, spanning from the Pacific to the Atlantic. Periods of upheaval—such as war, conquest, and migration—are emphasized as key moments of transformation, where societies learned and adapted through engagement, including from their adversaries.

Case studies include Byblos and Bronze Age Levantine networks, Minoan and Mycenaean Crete and Greece, the Thera eruption, Amarna correspondence and the Uluburun shipwreck, Ugarit’s alphabetic innovation, Phoenician and Tyrian expansion into the western Mediterranean and Atlantic, and the selective adoption of technologies and institutions that underpinned the Greek polis. The narrative follows Assyrian, Persian, and Hellenistic empires, shared mythic traditions, early Greek science drawing on Babylonian models, and Rome’s adaptive imperial culture and wide-ranging exchange via the Indian Ocean and trans-Saharan routes. It then covers late antiquity transformations, the rise of the Islamic caliphates and the translation movement, medieval Christian and Islamic intellectual exchanges, Mongol-era Afro-Eurasian integration, and the Black Death. The conclusion links the Age of Exploration’s expanding entanglements with emerging ideologies of separation, arguing that nineteenth-century ideas of a distinct Western Civilisation crystallized from much older, interconnected histories.

== Critical response ==
The Guardian called the book a “brilliant and learned challenge to modern western chauvinism,” praising its detail and perspective shifts while questioning Quinn’s stronger claim that distinct cultures do not exist.

The Wall Street Journal praised the book for making a "forceful argument" and "telling a story with great verve".

The Economist positioned the work within a "growing sub-canon of works" that explores history using new intellectual framings, alongside influential titles such as Yuval Noah Harari’s Sapiens and Peter Frankopan’s The Silk Roads and categorized it as an important, modern re-examination of history.

The paleoconservative Chronicles Magazine criticised the book as "profoundly political and one-sided", despite Quinn not "consciously pursuing any agenda" and that "most of what she writes is objectively true".

== See also ==
- Western world
- Western culture
- World-systems theory
- History of the Mediterranean region
