= Paul Millett =

British classicist and academic (born 1954)

Paul Millett (born 1954) is a British classicist and academic. He is a senior lecturer in Classics at the University of Cambridge and a fellow of Downing College, Cambridge. At Downing, Millett is the Director of Studies for Classics and serves as Admissions Tutor for arts subjects.

He studied at Cambridge University, with Moses I. Finley as his adviser.

Millett's research primarily focuses on ancient economics and the human interrelationships that subsequently take place in ancient Greece.

== Publications ==
- Aristotle and Athenian slavery, (2007) Greece and Rome.
- The Trial of Socrates Revisited, European Review of History 12 (2005) 23-62.
- The Economy in Ancient Greece (ed. R. Osborne), Vol.I of The Shorter Oxford History of Europe 23-51 (2000) Oxford.
- Lending and Borrowing in Ancient Athens (1991) Cambridge.
- Nomos: Essays in Athenian Law, Politics and Society, contains: ‘Law, society and Athens’ (with S. Todd) 1-18; ‘Sale, credit and exchange in Athenian law and society’ 167-94 (1990) Cambridge.
- Kosmos: Studies in Interpersonal Relations in Ancient Greece, containing chapter ‘Encounters in the Agora’ 203-28 (1988) Cambridge.
