= Professor of Ancient History (Cambridge) =

The Professorship of Ancient History at the University of Cambridge was established on 27 October 1898. The chair is based in the Faculty of Classics. The original electors were the Vice-Chancellor and eight persons elected by the Senate, two being nominated by the Council of the Senate, three by the General Board, and three by the Special Board for Classics.

== Professors of Ancient History ==
- James Smith Reid (1899–1925)
- Frank Ezra Adcock (1925–1951)
- Arnold Hugh Martin Jones (1951–1970)
- Sir Moses Finley (1970–1979)
- John Anthony Crook (1979–1984)
- Morris Keith Hopkins (1985–2001)
- Robin Osborne (2001-2024)
- Josephine Crawley Quinn (2025-)
