= John Crook (classicist) =

British scholar and historian (1921–2007)

John Anthony Crook, 1921–2007

John Anthony Crook FBA (5 November 1921 – 7 September 2007) was a professor of ancient history at the University of Cambridge and an authority on the law and life of ancient Rome. He wrote several chapters for the Cambridge Ancient History and was an accomplished linguist.

== Early life and education ==
Crook was born in Balham, South London, and educated at Dulwich College. He received a London County Council scholarship to attend St. John's College, Cambridge, in 1939 which he followed with postgraduate study at the University of Oxford.

== Academic career ==
Crook was first appointed University Lecturer in Classics at the University of Reading. He returned to St. John's in 1951 as a Fellow of the College and University Lecturer in Classics, rising to become Professor of Ancient History.

He kept the same rooms at St John's for 55 years and at the College Classical Society, which met in his rooms for 50 years, he would attempt to get the society to sing in Latin. One favourite was "Waltzing Matilda", in which the chorus began with the Latin word for swag: "ambiclitella! ambiclitella!".

Having been appointed a Fellow in 1970, Crook resigned from the British Academy in 1980, in protest at their failure to expel the British art historian and Soviet spy Anthony Blunt.

To mark his 80th birthday in 2001, he was presented with a Festschrift, Thinking Like a Lawyer, edited by Paul McKechnie.

The John Crook Scholarship, named in Crook's honor, is available to students studying for a second, two-year degree, at St John's College, Cambridge.

== War service ==
During the Second World War, Crook was drafted into the 9th Royal Fusiliers in 1942. He served in the Middle East and North Africa before being captured during the allied landings in Italy in 1943. He was sent to Stalag Luft VIII-B at Lamsdorf in Silesia as a prisoner of war. At that camp he learned German, and taught languages to other prisoners. He practiced his clarinet, which was the same instrument his father, a military bandsman, had played. He also developed his acting in Shakespearean roles. He began his military service as a private, but ended as a sergeant in the Royal Army Educational Corps.

== Selected publications ==
- Consilium Principis: Imperial Councils and Counsellors from Augustus to Diocletian. Cambridge University Press, Cambridge, 1955.
- Law and Life of Rome. Thames and Hudson, London, 1967.
- Legal Advocacy in the Roman World. Duckworth, London, 1995. ISBN 0715626507

Academic offices
Preceded by Moses Finley	Professor of Ancient History, Cambridge University; 1979–1985	Succeeded by Keith Hopkins
