= Faculty of Classics, University of Cambridge =

Constituent department of the University of Cambridge

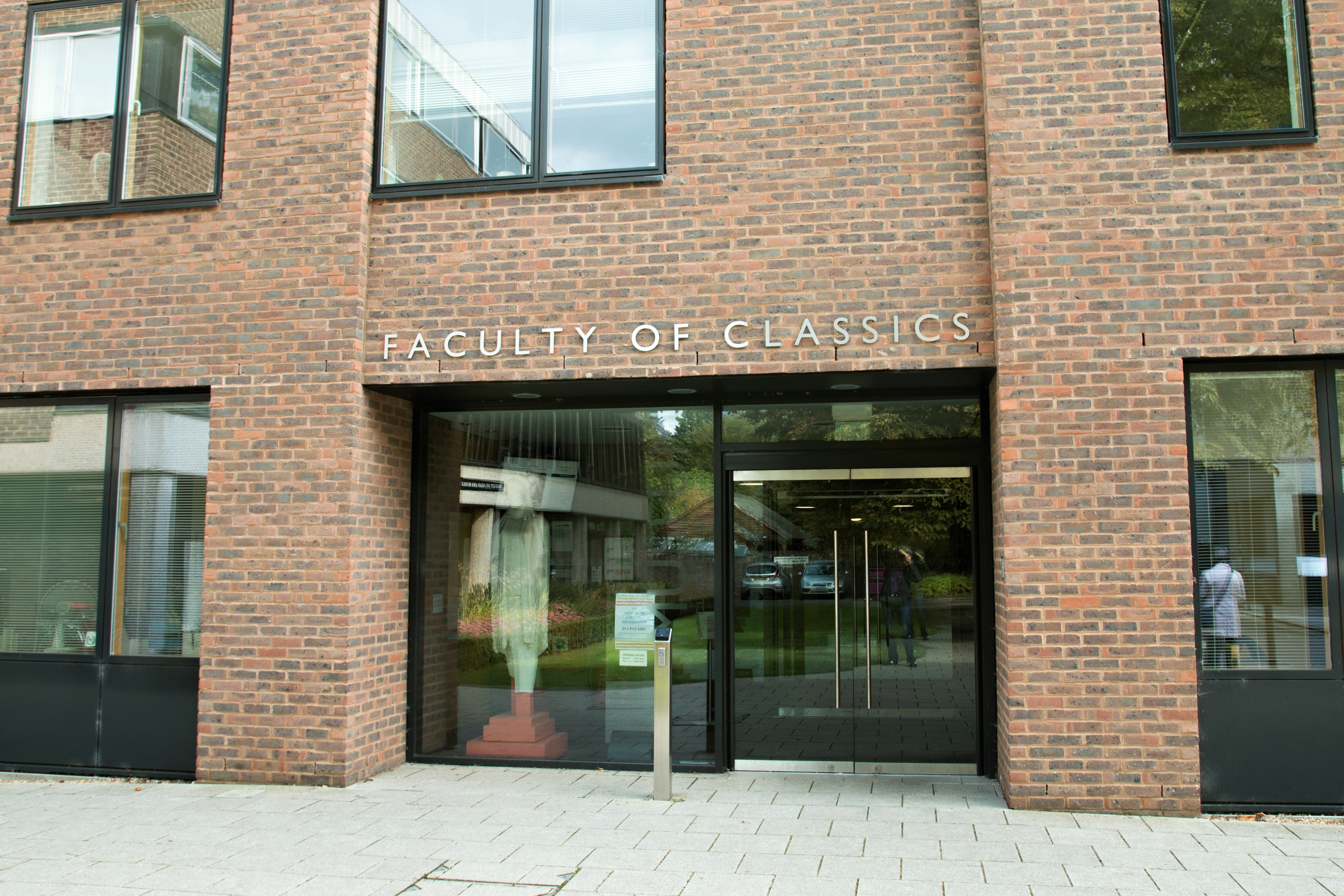
- The faculty building on the Sidgwick Site
- Type: Classics
- Parent institution: University of Cambridge
- Location: Cambridge, Cambridgeshire, England
- Website: www.classics.cam.ac.uk

The Faculty of Classics is one of the constituent departments of the University of Cambridge. It teaches the Classical Tripos. The Faculty is divided into five caucuses (i.e. areas of research and teaching); literature, ancient philosophy, ancient history, Classical art and archaeology, linguistics, and interdisciplinary studies.

The Faculty runs the Museum of Classical Archaeology on the first floor of the faculty building on the Sidgwick Site. The three-storey building was built in 1968 and includes lecture and seminar rooms, offices, and a library on the ground floor. The faculty building was refurbished and extended in 2010.

== Courses offered ==
At undergraduate level, the faculty offers the Classical Tripos as its Bachelor of Arts (BA) degree. For students who have taken Latin at A-Level this is a three-year course, and for those who have not studied Latin beyond GCSE it is a four-year course.

At postgraduate level, the faculty offers two degrees: Master of Philosophy (MPhil) and Doctor of Philosophy (PhD). It also contributes to the teaching of the Postgraduate Certificate in Education (PGCE) in Classics offered by the Faculty of Education. The MPhil is a nine-month taught course, which is examined by three essays and a 10,000 word thesis, or two essays, a language-exam/exercise, and the thesis. The PhD is a three-year research course, and it is examined by a doctoral thesis of up to 80,000 words. There is no formal teaching as the degree is completed through independent research. However, doctoral students may attend graduate seminars, undergraduate lectures, and can receive additional training in languages and/or specific disciplines (such as epigraphy or numismatics).

== Notable academics ==
There are a number of professorships, including endowed chairs, within the department:

- Regius Professor of Greek (currently Tim Whitmarsh)
- Kennedy Professor of Latin (currently Stephen Oakley)
- Professor of Ancient History (currently Robin Osborne)
- Laurence Professor of Ancient Philosophy (currently Gábor Betegh)
- Laurence Professor of Classical Archaeology (currently Michael Squire)
- A. G. Leventis Professor of Greek Culture (currently Tim Whitmarsh)

Other notable current academics include:

- Mary Beard, Professor of Classics
- James Clackson, Professor of Comparative Philology
- Peter Garnsey, Professor of the History of Classical Antiquity
- Simon Goldhill, Professor of Greek Literature and Culture
- Nigel Spivey, Senior Lecturer in Classics (Classical Art & Archaeology)

Former and retired academics:

- Myles Burnyeat, Laurence Professor Emeritus of Ancient Philosophy
- P. E. Easterling, Regius Professor Emerita of Greek
- J. G. W. Henderson, professor emeritus of Classics
- G. E. R. Lloyd, Regius Professor Emerita of Greek
- Joyce Reynolds, Reader in the Epigraphy of the Roman World
- Anthony Snodgrass, Laurence Professor Emeritus of Classical Archaeology
- Martin Millett, Laurence Professor Emeritus of Classical Archaeology
