= Tim Whitmarsh =

British classical scholar (born 1970)

Professor Tim Whitmarsh FBA
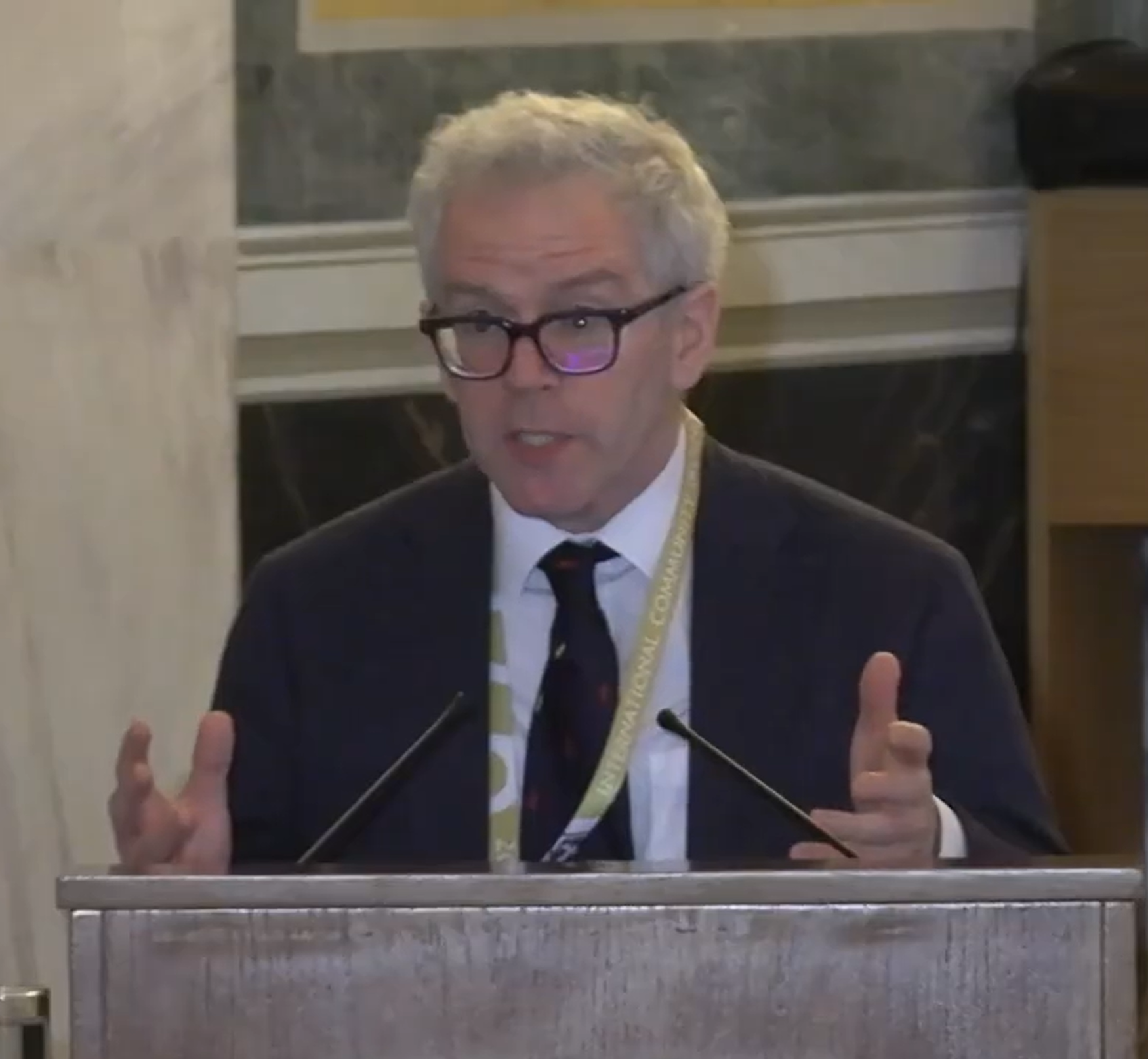
- Professor Whitmarsh speaking at a symposium at the Academy of Athens in 2026
- Born: Timothy John Guy Whitmarsh; 23 January 1970 (age 56); Chelmsford, Essex
- Title: Regius Professor of Greek, University of Cambridge

Academic background
- Education: Moor Park School; Malvern College; University of Cambridge
- Thesis: Symboulos: philosophy, power and culture in the literature of Roman Greece (1998)

Academic work
- Discipline: Classics
- Institutions: University of Exeter; University of Oxford; University of Cambridge
- Main interests: Ancient Greek Literature; Ancient Greek Religion; Roman Empire; Late Antique literature and Byzantine literature
- Website: www.classics.cam.ac.uk/directory/professor-tim-whitmarsh

Timothy John Guy Whitmarsh FBA (born 23 January 1970) is a British classicist and Regius Professor of Greek at the University of Cambridge. He is best known for his work on the Greek literary culture of the Roman Empire, the Second Sophistic and the ancient Greek novel, ancient atheism, and the emergence of Christianity.

== Early life and education ==
Whitmarsh was born on 23 January 1970 in Chelmsford, Essex, England. He was educated at Ashford Carbonell Primary School, now the Bishop Hooper School, Moor Park School, and at Malvern College. He then studied classics at King's College, Cambridge, receiving a BA in 1992 and MPhil in 1994, and St John's College, Cambridge, where his PhD was awarded in 1998.

== Academic career ==
From 2001 to 2007 he taught in the department of Classics and Ancient History at the University of Exeter. He then served as E. P. Warren Praelector, Fellow and Tutor in Greek at Corpus Christi College, Oxford, and Professor of Ancient Literatures at the University of Oxford. He remains an Honorary Fellow of Corpus Christi College, Oxford.

In October 2014, he succeeded Paul Cartledge as the A. G. Leventis Professor of Greek Culture at the University of Cambridge. From 2018 until 2024, he was editor-in-chief of the fifth edition Oxford Classical Dictionary; the fifth edition of the OCD is a continuously updated, digital-only version. In 2023, he became Regius Professor of Greek in Cambridge, succeeding Richard Hunter.

He is a member of the Postclassicisms Collective, whose book Postclassicisms was published in 2020.

=== Public lectures ===
Whitmarsh has given endowed public lectures in the UK and internationally. These include:

Year	Series title	Institution	Lecture title	Refs
2008	Phebe McClatchy Conley Lecture	Fresno State University	The Romance Between Greece and the East	
2010	John and Mary McDiarmid Lecture	University of Washington	Unscrolling the Text: Greek Literature and the Hellenistic Diaspora	
2015	August Boeckh Lecture	Humboldt Universität Berlin	History, Chance and Literary Resistance to the Roman Empire	
2015	Benefactors’ Fund Lecture	Dartmouth College	A Maiden's Consent: Romance and Sexual Ethics at the Dawn of Christianity	
2017	Center for Global Humanities Lecture	University of New England	How to Be an Atheist — The Ancient Greek Way	
2017	James Loeb Lecture	Harvard University	Walking with Socrates: Space, Place and Athenian Philosophy	
2022	Gifford Lectures	University of Aberdeen	Religion and Ancient Mediterranean Thought	
2025	Charles Alexander Robinson, Jr. Memorial Lecture	Brown University	The Greatest Stories Ever Told: Pagan Epics in the Later Roman Empire	
2026	L. H. Thomas Lecture	University of Alberta	Lighting the Way: "Hero and Leander" Reappraised	
2026	Erwin Rohde Vorlesungen Seminar	Heidelberg University	The Greatest Stories Ever Told	

== Public commentary ==
=== In the media ===
Whitmarsh has provided commentary in the media on matters relating to his field of work. He has appeared on television and radio for the BBC.

In 2018, he was quoted to have compared the appeal of the reality TV show Love Island to that of an ancient Greek drama. In the same year, in an interview with Radio Times, he debunked the misconceptions of race and ethnicity in ancient Greece and defended the casting of Black actors in the TV series Troy: Fall of a City.

=== Political views ===
Whitmarsh has publicly written about his views on matters relating to access and finance in the higher education sector in the UK. In 2013, he penned an op-ed in the Huffington Post to voice his opposition towards the plan to privatise the student loan system in England proposed by the then MP Danny Alexander. He wrote:

Higher education is the primary driver of social mobility in the UK. Huge fees are already a deterrent to many, but at least when they came in we were promised a benevolent, progressive loans structure. The involvement of the private sector in student financing can only damage that.

Commenting on the 2013 scandal whereby a student had his postgraduate studies offer withdrawn by St Hugh's College due to a perceived lack of living cost funds, Whitmarsh argued that there were "practical steps we can take to make higher education more accessible", such as better availability of part-time postgraduate studies.

In 2011, Whitmarsh was among the academics who condemned historian David Starkey for his comments about race on the BBC programme Newsnight.

In 2025, he applauded China's growing interest in pre-modern antiquity, and expressed admiration for Chinese classical scholarship, while also criticising the politicisation of classics in both China and Greece.

== Publications ==
=== As sole author/editor ===
Whitmarsh was the sole author of the following books:

- Greek Literature and the Roman Empire: The Politics of Imitation. Oxford University Press, 2001. ISBN 978-0-19-927137-5
- Ancient Greek Literature. Polity Press, 2004. ISBN 978-0-7456-2792-2.
- The Second Sophistic. New Surveys in the Classics, Vol. 35. Cambridge University Press, 2005. ISBN 978-0-19-856881-0
- Narrative and Identity in the Ancient Greek Novel: Returning Romance. Cambridge University Press, 2011. ISBN 978-0-521-82391-3 (Open access)
- Beyond the Second Sophistic: Adventures in Greek Postclassicism. University of California Press, 2013. ISBN 978-0-520-27681-9
- Battling the Gods: Atheism in the Ancient World. Faber & Faber, 2016. ISBN 978-0-571-27931-9
- Dirty Love: The Genealogy of the Ancient Greek Novel. Oxford University Press, 2018. ISBN 978-0-199-74265-3
- Achilles Tatius's Leucippe and Clitophon, Books I–II (edition and commentary). Cambridge University Press, 2020. ISBN 978-1-107-19036-8
- Rome's Age of Revolution: Augustus, Empire and the Making of Christianity. Bodley Head, 2026. ISBN 9781847925343

=== As co-author/co-editor ===
- The Postclassicisms Collective (2020). Postclassicisms. University of Chicago Press. ISBN 9780226672311.

=== As translator ===
- Achilles Tatius's Leucippe and Clitophon (introduction by Helen Morales). Oxford World's Classics. Oxford University Press, 2009. ISBN 9780199555475
- Nonnus's Dionysiaca (overall editor, and translator of books 33–40). University of California Press, 2026. ISBN 9780520281318.

Academic offices
Preceded by Paul Cartledge	A. G. Leventis Professor of Greek Culture, University of Cambridge; 2014–2023	Succeeded by Serafina Cuomo
Preceded by Richard Hunter	Regius Professor of Greek, University of Cambridge; 2023–	Succeeded by incumbent
