= The Roman Revolution =

Book by Ronald Syme

- Title page for The Roman Revolution (1939)
- Author: Ronald Syme
- Language: English
- Genre: Non-fiction
- Publisher: Oxford University Press
- Publication date: 1939
- Publication place: United Kingdom

The Roman Revolution (1939) is a scholarly study of the final years of the ancient Roman Republic and the creation of the Roman Empire by Caesar Augustus. The book was the work of Sir Ronald Syme (1903–1989), a noted Tacitean scholar, and was published by the Oxford University Press. It was immediately controversial.

== Thesis ==
Its main conclusion was that the structure of the Republic and its Senate were inadequate to the needs of Roman rule, and that Augustus was merely doing what was necessary to restore order in public life.

Syme relies on prosopography, especially the work of Friedrich Münzer, to show the extent to which Augustus achieved his unofficial but undisputed power by the development of personal relationships into a "Caesarian" party and used it to defeat and diminish the opposition one by one. The process was slow, with the young Octavian initially just using his position as a relative of Julius Caesar to pursue Caesar's assassins, then over a period of years gradually accumulating personal power while nominally restoring the Republic. In addition, the portrait he paints of Augustus as a somewhat sinister autocratic figure has been immensely influential among subsequent generations of classicists.

Syme's description of Roman politics viewed the late republic "as a conflict between a dominant oligarchy drawn from a set of powerful families and their opponents" which operated primarily not in ideological terms, but in terms of feuds between family-based factions. Syme argued:

The political life of the Roman Republic was stamped and swayed, not by parties and programmes of a modern and parliamentary character, not by the ostensible opposition between senate and people, optimates and populares, nobiles and novi homines, but by the strife for power, wealth and glory. The contestants were the nobiles among themselves, as individuals or in groups, open in the elections and in the courts of law, or masked by secret intrigue.

== Reception ==
Maurice Bowra said in 1939 of Syme's The Roman Revolution: "His work is extraordinarily persuasive and interesting... the best book on Roman history that has appeared for many years".

Syme's conclusion of inevitability is less strongly supported than his elucidation of the takeover process, since at each point we see that Augustus is exercising his free choice, albeit for what he sees as the good of his country. In The Last Generation of the Roman Republic (1974), Erich Gruen offered an opposing point of view, arguing that the traditional view of the Republic's decay is not actually supported by the objective evidence.

== Editions ==
The Roman Revolution has been reprinted regularly by OUP since its first appearance, most recently in 2002 (ISBN 0-19-280320-4). (Corrections to the text were made by the author in 1952 and 1956.)

A revised German translation was published by Klett-Cotta in 2003 (Die römische Revolution).

The Italian edition was first published by Einaudi in 1962, with an introduction by Arnaldo Momigliano. A new, revised edition was published in 2014, with an introduction by Giusto Traina (ISBN 9788806221638).

A Korean translation in two volumes was published by Hangilsa Publishing Co. in 2006 (with the introduction by translators, Seung-il Hur and Duk-su Kim) (『로마혁명사 1』ISBN 978-8935656196 and『로마혁명사 2』ISBN 978-8935656202)

A new English edition, with an introduction by G.W. Bowersock, was published by the Folio Society in June, 2009.

A Japanese translation in two volumes was published by Iwanami Shoten in 2013 (with the second edition's pagination printed in margin and the original index rendered in Japanese included) (『ローマ革命（上）』ISBN 978-4000025980 and『ローマ革命（下）』ISBN 978-4000025997).
