= A. G. Leventis Professor of Greek Culture =

Professorship at the University of Cambridge

The A. G. Leventis Professorship of Greek Culture is the first professorship in Classics to have been endowed at the University of Cambridge since World War II. Its purpose is to focus on the study of more than 1,000 years of Greek cultural achievements and to highlight the lasting influence they continue to have on society today.

The chair was endowed by a donation of £2.361 million from the Cyprus-based A. G. Leventis Foundation, which was established in 1979 as a result of provisions made by Anastasios George Leventis, with the aim of supporting educational, cultural, artistic and philanthropic causes with an emphasis on Greek and Cypriot cultural heritage.

== List of A. G. Leventis Professors of Greek Culture ==
- 2008–2014: Paul Cartledge
- 2014–2023: Tim Whitmarsh
- Since 2024: Serafina Cuomo
