= Josephine Crawley Quinn =

Professor of ancient history

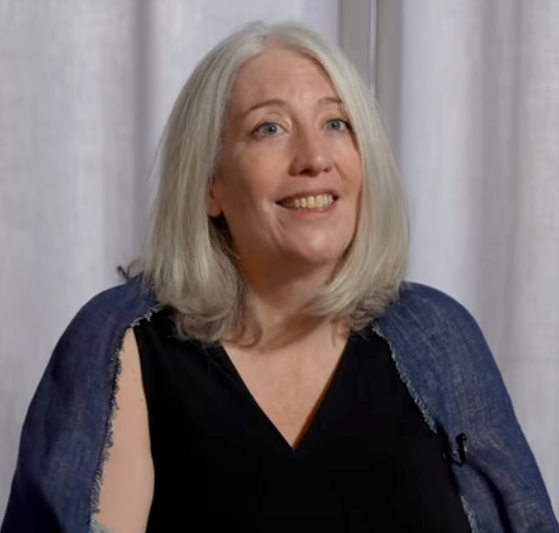
- In a 2025 interview
- Born: 10 September 1973 (age 53)

Academic background
- Education: Wadham College, Oxford; University of California, Berkeley
- Thesis: Imperialism and Culture in North Africa: The Hellenistic and Early Roman Eras
- Doctoral advisor: Erich Gruen

Academic work
- Discipline: Classics
- Sub-discipline: Ancient history
- Institutions: British School at Rome; St John's College, Oxford; Worcester College, Oxford; St John's College, Cambridge

Josephine Crawley Quinn (born 10 September 1973) is an Irish historian and archaeologist, working across ancient Mediterranean history. Appointed on 1 January 2025, she is the first woman to hold the Professorship of Ancient History at the University of Cambridge, and is a fellow at St. John's College. Quinn was previously Professor of Ancient History in the Faculty of Classics, University of Oxford and Martin Frederiksen Fellow and Tutor in Ancient History at Worcester College, University of Oxford.

== Career ==
Quinn obtained a BA in classical studies in 1996 from Wadham College, Oxford. She then obtained an MA (1998) and PhD (2003) in Ancient History and Mediterranean Archaeology at the University of California, Berkeley, where her supervisor was Erich Gruen. In 2001–2002, she was the Ralegh Radford Rome Scholar at the British School at Rome. In 2003–2004 she was a College Lecturer in Ancient History at St John's College, Oxford, and held her fellowship of Worcester College from 2004 to 2024. In 2008 she was a visiting scholar at the Getty Villa.

Quinn is co-director of the Oxford Centre for Phoenician and Punic Studies, and co-director of the Tunisian-British Excavations at Utica, Tunisia with Andrew Wilson and Elizabeth Fentress.

Between 2006 and 2011, Quinn served as the editor of the Papers of the British School at Rome.

Quinn won the Zvi Meitar/Vice-Chancellor Oxford University Research Prize in the Humanities in 2009. She has published numerous articles and two co-edited volumes, the Hellenistic West, and The Punic Mediterranean. In 2018 Quinn published the monograph In Search of the Phoenicians, described as a pioneering and exhilarating volume, which argues that the idea of the Phoenicians as a distinct, self-identifying group, is a modern invention. The book was awarded the Society for Classical Studies Goodwin Award of Merit in 2019.

In 2024, Quinn published How the World Made the West, a history of "Western civilization" from the Bronze Age to the Age of Discovery and a critique of its supposed basis in Graeco-Roman culture. The book was favourably reviewed. Steven Poole in The Guardian declared: "this book triumphs as a brilliant and learned challenge to modern western chauvinism. To the extent that we have inherited classical culture, Quinn reminds us, it is in a rather perverted form." Tristram Hunt in The Financial Times wrote: "Among Quinn’s achievements is her use of advanced discoveries in DNA to scuttle dearly held civilisational myths. The idea of a separate Etruscan race in the ninth century BC is shot down by evidence of their genetic profile being very similar to their Italian neighbours."

During 2025 she was appointed Professor of Ancient History at the Faculty of Classics at the University of Cambridge and was appointed a fellow of St John's College, Cambridge.

=== Media work ===
Quinn contributes to the London Review of Books and the New York Review of Books. She has appeared twice as an expert panelist on the BBC Radio 4 series In Our Time, discussing the Phoenicians (2014) and the Garamantes (2026).

== Personal life ==
Quinn is the daughter of the former MEP Christine Crawley, Baroness Crawley.

== Selected publications ==
- Quinn, J.C. 2010. The reinvention of Lepcis. In Bollettino di Archeologia ON LINE. Roma 2008 - International Congress of Classical Archaeology Meetings Between Cultures in the Ancient Mediterranean.
- Quinn, J. and Wilson, A. 2013. "Capitolia". Journal of Roman Studies 103: 117–173.
- Quinn, J.C., McLynn, N, Kerr and R.M., Hadas, D. 2014. "Augustine's Canaanities". Papers of the British School at Rome 82: 175–197.
- Quinn, J.C. and Vella, N.C. 2014. The Punic Mediterranean: Identities and Identification from Phoenician Settlement to Roman Rule. Cambridge: Cambridge University Press.
- Quinn, J.C. 2017. "Translating empire from Carthage to Rome". Classical Philology 112(3): 312–331.
- Quinn, J. 2018. In Search of the Phoenicians. Princeton: Princeton University Press.
- Quinn, J. 2024. How the World Made the West: A 4,000-Year History. Bloomsbury Press.
