= The Ancient Economy =

1973 book by Moses I. Finley

- First edition
- Author: Moses I. Finley
- Series: Sather Classical Lectures; Vol. 43
- Publisher: University of California Press
- Publication date: 1973
- Media type: Print (hardcover and paperback)
- Pages: 222
- ISBN: 0-520-02436-2
- OCLC: 765341
- Dewey Decimal: 330.938 21
- LC Class: HC31 .F5

The Ancient Economy is an influential book about the economic system of classical antiquity written by the classicist Moses I. Finley. It was originally published in 1973 with new editions in 1985 and 1992. Finley interpreted the economy from 1000 BC to AD 500 sociologically rather than through use of economic models (as did Michael Rostovtzeff). Finley viewed the ancient economy as largely a by-product of status, with economic relations being embedded in ancient institutions that are very much unlike those present in modern times.

He viewed the ancient economy as largely stagnant since, among other things, the scope of economic action was not directed to economic or productive growth as is so often the case in modern times: technological innovations therefore went without adoption, large projects were executed for prestige rather than practical benefit, and economic development, or profit maximisation. Such views, and the uncritical acceptance of elite ancient writers' economic mentalités, have been challenged and overturned by archaeological discoveries through the late 20th century.

== Summary ==
Finley argued that ancient economic activity was embedded in a society of political and social values which made it substantively different from modern economies. He argued that the ancient well-to-do were disinterested in production or productivity improvements. Instead, they focused on socially prestigious consumption goods and self-sufficiency. This implied limited trade in all but necessities (mainly food) and luxury goods as well as stagnation in technology and economic thought. Many scholars identified Finley with the "primitivists", who argued that the economies of ancient Greece and Rome were dominated by subsistence farming and household-level development; this was in contrast to the "modernists" who viewed economic activities in the ancient world to be highly analogous to modern levels of specialisation and trade. However, Finley rejected placement in this primitivist-modernist debate, instead arguing on different dimensions: whether or not the ancient economy could be understood with reference to formalist unchanging economic laws (as is argued by neoclassical economics) or needed to be understood with reference to embedded social values.

To show how the economies of Ancient Greece and Rome differed from our times, he first examines how the Ancients lacked even the concept of an "economy" in the way we refer to it in our own times. Economy derives from a Greek word, οἰκονόμος, "one who manages a household". The household was the most important economic unit. Of course, they mined, taxed, and traded, but what the ancients did not do was to combine all their commercial activities into an overarching sub-system of society, a giant marketplace where the means of production and distribution responded to market forces such as the cost of labour, supply and demand, trade routes, etc. Moreover, Finley takes the fact that the Ancient Greeks and Romans did not have a sophisticated accounting system as well as how imprecise or carefree they are about numerical data to imply the lack of an economy resembling Western modern ones that place exorbitant demands on numerical computations and precise accounting records.

He also deals with the roles of orders and status. He argues that because the ancients placed so much emphasis on status, which heavily regulated what commercial activities was acceptable for those in the upper orders and well as the lower ones, their economy differed from any modern economy where everyone was free and able to participate in whatever legal commercial enterprise. Finley also discusses the institution of slavery which was very prominent in the ancient world. The relationship between master and slave was complex and even among slaves, there was a diversity of societal rankings. Yet despite this complexity, Finley shows how slavery provided free labour that at times had to be curtailed in order to provide work for the native artisans. Slavery heavily influenced the value placed on labour and certain jobs. Thus, the distribution of labour as well as the means of production that one sees in the ancient economy was different from how modern economies function where human capital plays a role in determinant of price as well as on supply.

Another relationship Finley discusses is the way the Ancients viewed the value of land. The ownership of a piece of land for the Ancient Greeks and Romans was not seen as a capital investment where profits could be obtained from the growing and selling of crops, but used as showpieces to enhance one's status as well as something that was inherently desirable from a traditional standpoint where economics played no part. To illustrate this, Finley turns to one of Pliny's letters where he writes that he will have to borrow money to buy more land. In the letter, Pliny does not discuss if this new purchase is an economically wise one in terms of the profits that can be derived from it. The last part of the book, Finley discusses the discrepancies between life in the urban and rural settings. He also writes about how government forces did not play a role in managing the economy and treasury in the same ways modern governments are expected to do in most Western economies.

== Reception ==
The book has had such an impact on classical scholarship that the views brought forward in The Ancient Economy has been labeled "the Finley/Polanyi orthodoxy". Finley covers both ancient economic thought, wealth, the role of a government, the use of slavery, and the tax system. "Indeed, no individual writer ... has attempted [as of 2000] a comprehensive economic overview of the entire classical world since Finley, though period specific, regional or thematic work has abounded".

== Bibliography ==
- Greene, Kevin (2000). "Technological innovation and economic progress in the ancient world: M. I. Finley re-considered". Economic History Review. 53 (1): 29–59. ISSN 0013-0117. JSTOR 2599464.
- Jew, Daniel; Osborne, Robin; Scott, Michael, eds. (2016). M I Finley: an ancient historian and his impact. Cambridge Classical Studies. Cambridge University Press. ISBN 978-1-107-14926-7.
  - Jew, Daniel; Osborne, Robin; Scott, Michael (2016a). "Introduction: Finley's impact – a balance sheet". In Jew, Osborne & Scott (2016), pp. 1–12.
  - Launaro, Alessandro. "Finley and the ancient economy". In Jew, Osborne & Scott (2016), pp. 227–49.
