= Ronald Syme =

New Zealand born British historian and classicist (1903–1989)

Sir Ronald Syme OM FBA
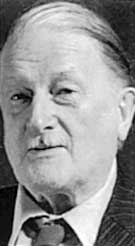
- Born: 11 March 1903; Eltham, New Zealand
- Died: 4 September 1989 (aged 86); Oxford, England

Academic background
- Education: New Plymouth Boys' High School
- Alma mater: University of Auckland; Victoria University of Wellington; Oriel College, Oxford

Academic work
- Discipline: Ancient historian
- Sub-discipline: Roman history; Crisis of the Roman Republic; Roman army; prosopography
- Institutions: Trinity College, Oxford; Brasenose College, Oxford; Wolfson College, Oxford
- Doctoral students: Barbara Levick; Miriam T. Griffin; Fergus Millar
- Notable works: The Roman Revolution (1939)

Sir Ronald Syme (11 March 1903 – 4 September 1989) was a New Zealand-born historian and classicist. He was regarded as the greatest historian of ancient Rome since Theodor Mommsen and the most brilliant exponent of the history of the Roman Empire since Edward Gibbon. His great work was The Roman Revolution (1939), a masterly and controversial analysis of political life in the Roman Republic following the assassination of Julius Caesar, offering critical views about Octavian in particular that challenged widely accepted views in contemporary academia.

== Life ==
Syme was born to David and Florence Syme in Eltham, New Zealand in 1903, where he attended primary. He then attended high school at Stratford District High School, where a teacher noticed his talent and interest in languages. A bad case of measles seriously damaged his vision during this period. He moved to New Plymouth Boys' High School (a house of which bears his name today) at the age of 15, and was head of his class for both of his two years. He continued to the University of Auckland and Victoria University of Wellington, where he studied French language and literature while working on his degree in Classics. He then attended Oriel College, Oxford, between 1925 and 1927, gaining First Class honours in Literae Humaniores (ancient history and philosophy). In 1926, he won the Gaisford Prize for Greek Prose for translating a section of Thomas More's Utopia into Platonic prose, and the following year won the Prize again (for Verse) for a translation of part of William Morris's Sigurd the Volsung into Homeric hexameters.

His first scholarly work was published by the Journal of Roman Studies in 1928. In 1929 he became a Fellow of Trinity College, Oxford, where he became known for his studies of the Roman army and the frontiers of the Empire. During the Second World War, he worked as a press attaché in the British Embassies of Belgrade (where he acquired a knowledge of Serbo-Croatian) and Ankara, later taking a chair in classical philology at Istanbul University. His refusal to discuss the nature of his work during this period led some to speculate that he worked for the British intelligence services in Turkey, but proof for this hypothesis is lacking.

Sir Ronald's work at Unesco is referred to in the autobiographical works of a collaborator, Jean d'Ormesson.

After being elected a Fellow of the British Academy in 1944, Syme was appointed Camden Professor of Ancient History at Brasenose College, Oxford, in 1949, a position which he held until his retirement in 1970. Syme was also appointed fellow of Wolfson College, Oxford, from 1970 until the late 1980s, where an annual lecture was established in his memory.

Syme was knighted in 1959. He was elected to the American Philosophical Society and the American Academy of Arts and Sciences the same year. He received the Order of Merit in 1976. He continued his prolific writing and editing until his death at the age of 86. He died in Oxford on September 4, 1989.

== Major works ==
The work for which Syme is chiefly remembered, The Roman Revolution (1939), is widely considered a masterly and controversial analysis of Roman political life in the period following the 44 BCE assassination of Julius Caesar. Inspired by the rise of fascist regimes in Germany and Italy, and following Tacitus in both literary style and pessimistic insight, the work challenged prevailing attitudes concerning the last years of the Roman Republic. Syme's main conclusion was that the structure of the Republic and its Senate were inadequate for the needs of Roman rule; Augustus merely did what was necessary to restore order in public life, but was a dictatorial figure whose true nature was cloaked by the panegyrics written to honour him in his last years and after his death. "The Roman constitution", Syme wrote, "was a screen and a sham"; Octavian's supposed restoration of the Republic was a pretence on which he had built a monarchy based on personal relationships and the ambition of Rome's political families. In The Roman Revolution Syme first used, with dazzling effect, the historical method of prosopography—tracing the linkages of kinship, marriage, and shared interest among the various leading families of republican and imperial Rome. By stressing prosopographical analysis, Syme rejected the force of ideas in politics, dismissing most such invocations of constitutional and political principle as nothing more than "political catchwords". In the bleak cynicism about political ideas and political life, The Roman Revolution strongly resembled another controversial historical masterwork, The Structure of Politics at the Accession of George III, published in 1930 by the specialist in eighteenth-century British political history, Sir Lewis B. Namier.

Syme's next work was his definitive two-volume biography of Tacitus (1958). The work's forty-five chapters and ninety-five appendices make up the most complete study of Tacitus yet produced, backed by an exhaustive treatment of the historical and political background—the Empire's first century—of his life.

In 1958, Oxford University Press published Colonial Élites. Rome, Spain and the Americas, which presents the three lectures that Syme offered at McMaster University in Ontario in January 1958 as part of the Whidden Lectures. Syme compares the three empires that have endured for the longest periods of time in Western History: Rome, Spain, and Britain. Syme considers that the duration of an Empire links directly to the character of the men who are in charge of the imperial administration, in particular that of the colonies. In his own words, the "strength and vitality of an empire is frequently due to the new aristocracy from the periphery". This book is currently out of print.

Syme's biography of Sallust (1964), based on his Sather Lectures at the University of California, is also regarded as authoritative. His four books and numerous essays on the Historia Augusta, including the publication Emperors and Biography: Studies in the Historia Augusta, firmly established the fraudulent nature of that work; he famously dubbed the anonymous author "a rogue grammarian". Allen M. Ward stated in The Classical World, Vol. 65, No. 3 (Nov., 1971), pp. 100–101, that: "No one interested in the H.A. or Roman history of the third century A.D. can ignore this book." On the content of the book itself, Peter White writes: "Syme recovers portions, though miserably small portions, of the true history of the emperors from Severus Alexander to Diocletian. There are still other essays that escape this enumeration. Among them are two of the best in the book, an investigation of the patterns by which personal names have been faked and an expose of the procedures by which the biographer concocted the first five lives of pretenders and heirs apparent." Syme gives 10 ways to decipher fictitious names in a chapter called 'Bogus Names'. He states: IX. Perverted names. One example is clear. Using Suetonius, the author changed 'Mummia' to 'Memmia' (Alex. 20. 3, cf. above). That is a mere trifle in the devices of the HA. If an author is anxious to be plausible, he may try to convey an impression of novelty (and hence of authenticity) by names that look original because different. Thus 'Avulnius' and 'Murrentius' (Aur. 13. I). One trick is to modify the shape of familiar names. Several instances have been detected. As consul in 258, the HA produces 'Nemmius Fuscus' (or 'Memmius Fuscus'). Regarding the HA authors' identity, Syme states: "From time to time the deceiver lowers the mask. For example, when scourging the follies and fraudulence of other biographers (whom he invents), notably 'Adius Junius Cordus'. The prime revelation occurs in the exordium of the Vita Aureliani. The Prefect of the City, after friendly and encouraging discourse on the high themes of history and veracity, tells the author to write as his fancy dictates. All the classical historians were liars, and he can join their company with a clear conscience..." – "Well then, write as you will. You will be safe in saying whatever you wish, since you will have as comrades in falsehood those authors whom we admire for the style of their histories."(Aur. 2. 2)

His History in Ovid (1978) places the great Roman poet Ovid firmly in his social context.

Syme's The Augustan Aristocracy (1986) traces the prominent families under Augustus as a sequel to The Roman Revolution. Syme examined how and why Augustus promoted bankrupt patrician families and new politicians simultaneously to forge a coalition in government that would back his agenda for a new Rome.

A posthumous work (edited for publication by Anthony Birley), Anatolica (1995), is devoted to Strabo and deals with the geography of southern Armenia and mainly eastern parts of Asia Minor. His shorter works are collected in the seven volumes of Roman Papers (1979–1991), the first two volumes of which are edited by Ernst Badian, and the remainder by Anthony Birley.

Syme's doctoral students at the University of Oxford included Barbara Levick (whose thesis in the mid-1950s dealt with Roman colonies in south Asia Minor), and Miriam T. Griffin (1968), whose thesis was entitled Seneca: the statesman and the writer.

== Legacy ==
- Victoria University of Wellington's Classics Department holds a lecture in Syme's honour every two years.

Academic offices
Preceded by Hugh Last	Camden Professor of Ancient History, Oxford University; 1949–1970	Succeeded by Peter Brunt
