= Faculty of Classics, University of Oxford =

Academic department in the UK

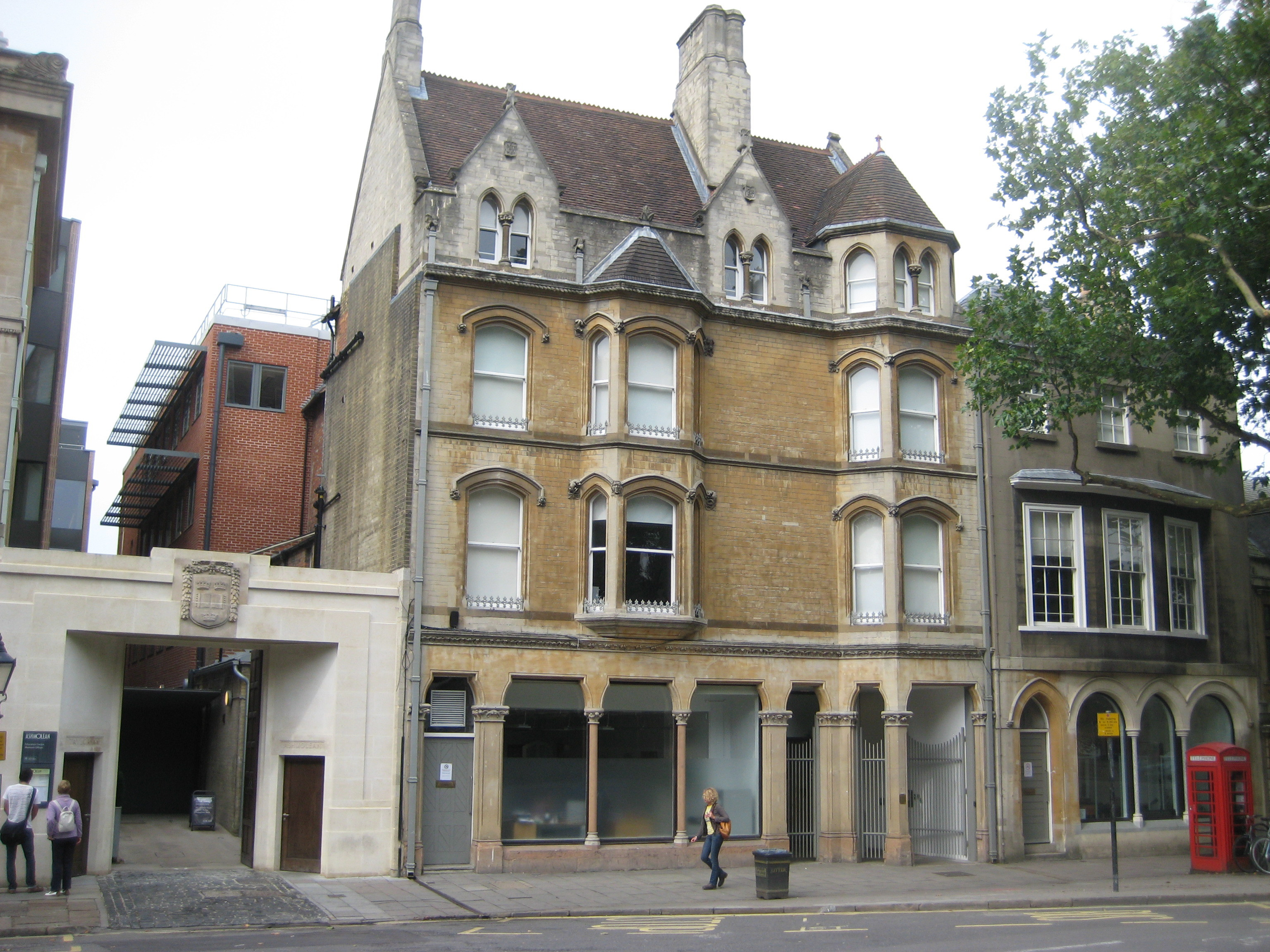
The Ioannou Centre for Classical and Byzantine Studies, exterior

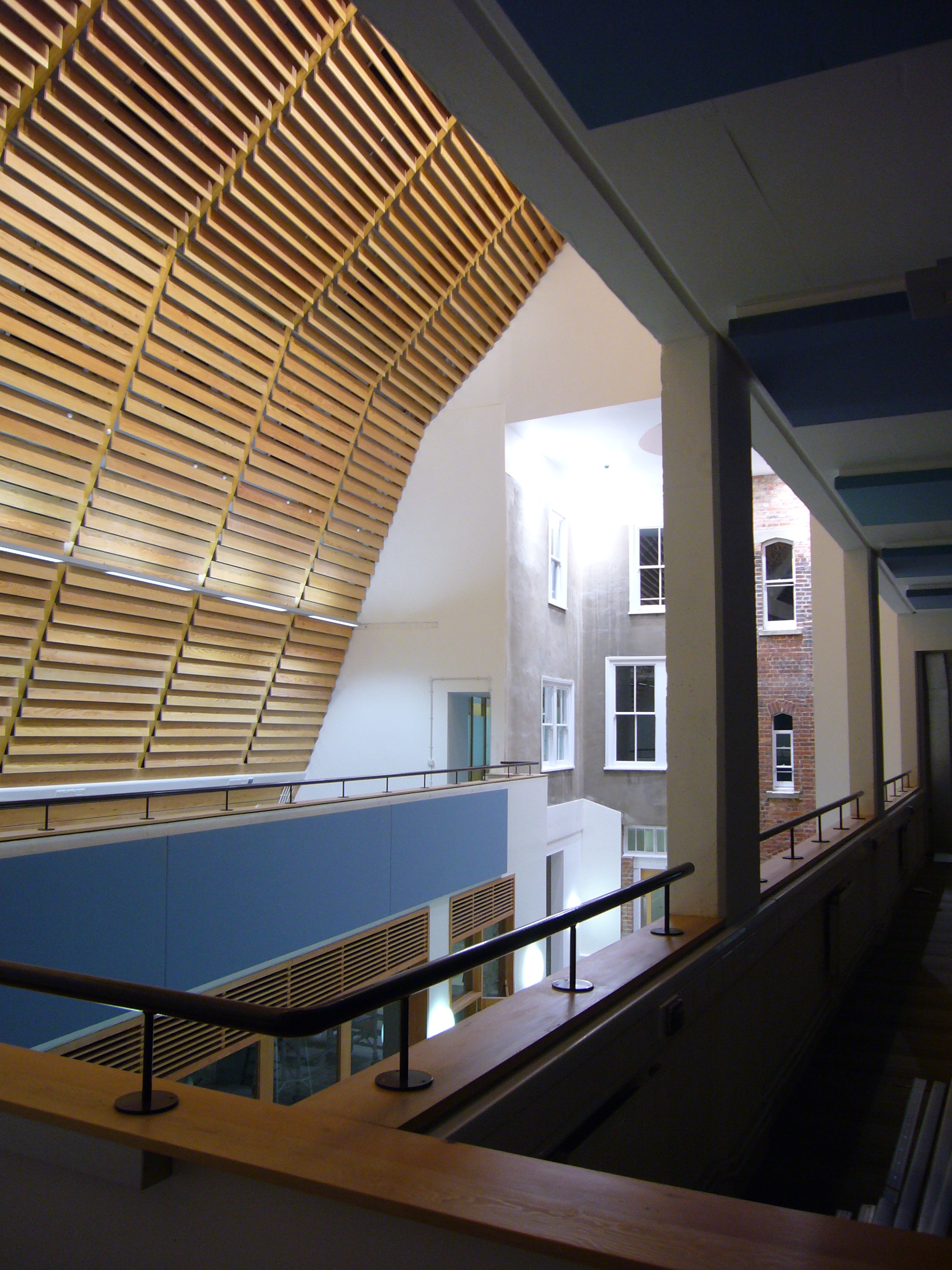
Stelios Ioannou Centre for Classical and Byzantine Studies, atrium

The Faculty of Classics, previously the Faculty of Literae Humaniores, is an academic department of the Humanities Division at the University of Oxford in Oxford, England, United Kingdom. It focuses on the teaching and research of classics.

The teaching of classics at Oxford was present since its conception and was at the centre of nearly all its undergraduates' education well into the twentieth century. The Faculty was renamed "Classics" in 2001 after Philosophy, which had previously been a sub-faculty, became a faculty in its own right. The Faculty of Classics is divided into two sub-faculties of Classical Languages & Literature, and Ancient History & Classical Archaeology. The Faculty organises teaching and research - the main undergraduate programme being known as Literae Humaniores. It also runs a BA programme in Classical Archaeology and Ancient History. The Faculty of Classics is part of the Humanities Division. It runs projects including the Oxyrhynchus Papyrus Project and the Archive of Performances of Greek and Roman Drama. It is the largest Classics department at any university in the world.

== Location ==
The Faculty is based at the Ioannou School for Research in Classical and Byzantine Studies on St. Giles', next to the Ashmolean Museum and Bodleian Art, Archaeology and Ancient World Library. These three therefore form an informal 'Classics Triangle' in Oxford. The Stelios Ioannou Centre for Classical and Byzantine Studies was opened in 2007 and designed by van Heyningen and Haward Architects. It provides research and teaching facilities for the Faculty and involved demolishing the old subsidiary buildings, while the significant parts of the existing buildings were retained to create a new central atrium.

== Research ==
The Faculty runs a large number of research projects, including:

- Oxyrhynchus Papyri
- Dictionary of Medieval Latin from British Sources
- Classical Art Research Centre (which includes the Beazley Archive)
- Lexicon of Greek Personal Names
- Roman Inscriptions of Britain
- Sphakia Survey
- Byzantine Ceramics
- Centre for the Study of Ancient Documents
- Archive of Performances of Greek and Roman Drama
- Bibliotheca Academica Translationum
- Roman Provincial Coinage in the Antonine Period
- Research Archive for Greek and Roman Sculpture
- Greek Literary Hands of the Roman Period
- Imaging Papyri
- Reception of Greek Literature 300 BC-800 AD: Traditions of the Fragment
- e-Science and Ancient Documents Project
- The Oxford Roman Economy Project (OxRep)
- The Monumenta Asiae Minoris Antiqua XI
- Social and Cultural Construction of Emotions: The Greek Paradigm
- Manar al-Athar photo archive

== Notable academics ==
Statutory Professors:

- Camden Professor of Ancient History (currently Nicholas Purcell)
- Corpus Christi Professor of Latin (currently Tobias Reinhardt)
- Lincoln Professor of Classical Archaeology and Art (currently R.R.R. Smith)
- Regius Professor of Greek (Gregory Hutchinson)
- Wykeham Professor of Ancient History (currently Nino Luraghi)

Other notable current academics:

- Rhiannon Ash
- Anna Clark
- Ursula Coope, Professor of Ancient Philosophy
- Martin Goodman
- Stephen Harrison
- Simon Hornblower
- Christopher Howgego
- Irene Lemos
- Jane Lightfoot
- Fiona Macintosh, Professor of Classical Reception
- Catherine Morgan
- Rosalind Thomas, Professor of Greek History
- Andrew Wilson

Notable former academics:

- John Boardman
- Myles Burnyeat
- Averil Cameron
- Barry Cunliffe
- Jasper Griffin
- Terence Irwin
- Elizabeth Jeffreys
- Donna Carol Kurtz
- Robin Lane Fox
- Hugh Lloyd-Jones
- Fergus Millar
- Christopher Pelling
- Donald Russell
- Oliver Taplin
- Susan Treggiari
- Martin Litchfield West
- Stephanie West
