= Archive of Performances of Greek and Roman Drama =

APGRD
- Founders: Edith Hall and Oliver Taplin
- Established: 1996
- Focus: performances of Greek and Roman drama and epic, translation of Greek and Roman drama, performance reception
- Director: Pantelis Michelakis
- Faculty: Classics, University of Oxford
- Slogan: Research, Preserve, Create
- Location: Ioannou Centre for Classical and Byzantine Studies, Oxford
- Website: www.apgrd.ox.ac.uk

The Archive of Performances of Greek and Roman Drama (APGRD) is a research project based at the University of Oxford, England, founded in 1996 by Edith Hall and Oliver Taplin. The current director is Pantelis Michelakis.

== Overview ==
The APGRD's focus is the study of performances of ancient drama and epic worldwide, ranging from the original performances in antiquity to the present day. It also runs a number of programmes promoting new writing and performance, including the 2005–2011 Onassis Programme, which commissioned, developed and produced professional work from artists from around the world, including Seamus Heaney, Derek Walcott and Yaël Farber.

The APGRD was praised by Oxford University for its engagement with authors, directors and other theatre practitioners, and was selected as one of the university's Impacts showcase projects for helping to "sustain the distinctive and dynamic nature of the UK theatre". The project's publications have been described as playing "a pivotal role in establishing the parameters and methodologies of the study of the reception of Classical drama in performance".

== Archival collections ==
The APGRD maintains and preserves a number of archival collections. The centrepiece is the APGRD's own research archive, a collection of material relating to modern performances of ancient drama. The APGRD also holds a number of other collections, including:

- The Leyhausen-Spiess Collection - the collected papers of German director and academic Wilhelm Leyhausen, founder of the Delphic Institute.
- The David Raeburn Collection - a collection of papers and records (including promptbooks) belonging to classicist and translator David Raeburn, who also produced the Bradfield School Greek play.
- The Abd'Elkader Farrah collection - designs and artwork for several of the Greek and Shakespearian productions of the Algerian theatre designer Abd'Elkader Farrah (also known as Abdel Farrah).

In addition, the APGRD's performance database has records covering more than 10,000 modern productions of ancient drama and epic.

== APGRD e-books ==
Medea, a performance history (published 2016) is a multimedia/interactive e-book on the production history of Euripides’ Medea – an ancient Greek tragedy about a mother who, betrayed by her husband, exacts revenge by killing her children. The object-rich ebook draws on a unique collection of archival material and research at the APGRD and uses images, film, unique interviews and digital objects to tell the story of a play that has inspired countless interpretations, onstage and onscreen, in dance, drama and opera across the globe from antiquity to the present.

The ebook is free to download and is available either as an iBook for Apple devices (via iTunes) or as an EPUB. The ebook is based upon and updates Medea in Performance, 1500-2000, edited by Edith Hall, Fiona Macintosh, and Oliver Taplin.

A second e-book by the APGRD, Agamemnon, a performance history, which focuses on performances of Aeschylus' Agamemnon, is forthcoming (2020).

== Selected publications ==
A number of books have been published under the auspices of the APGRD. These include:

- Medea in Performance, 1500-2000, edited by Edith Hall, Fiona Macintosh, and Oliver Taplin (Legenda, Oxford, 2000)
- Dionysus Since 69: Greek Tragedy at the Dawn of the Third Millennium, edited by Edith Hall, Fiona Macintosh, and Amanda Wrigley (OUP, 2004)
- Agamemnon in Performance: 458 BC to AD 2004, edited by Fiona Macintosh, Pantelis Michelakis, Edith Hall, and Oliver Taplin (OUP, 2005)
- Greek Tragedy and the British Theatre 1660–1914, by Edith Hall and Fiona Macintosh (OUP, 2005)
- Aristophanes in Performance, 421 BC to AD 2007: Peace, Birds, and Frogs, edited by Edith Hall and Amanda Wrigley (Oxford: Legenda, 2007)
- Pots and Plays: Interactions between Tragedy and Greek Vase-painting of the Fourth Century BC, by Oliver Taplin (Getty Publications, 2007)
- New Directions in Ancient Pantomime, edited by Edith Hall and Rosie Wyles (OUP, 2008)
- Oedipus Tyrannus, by Fiona Macintosh (Cambridge University Press, 2009)
- Ancient Drama in Music for the Modern Stage, edited by Peter Brown and Suzana Ograjenšek (OUP, 2010)
- The Ancient Dancer in the Modern World: Responses to Greek and Roman Dance, edited by Fiona Macintosh (OUP, 2010)
- Theorising Performance: Greek Tragedy, Cultural History and Critical Practice, edited by Edith Hall and Stephe Harrop (Duckworth, 2010)
- The Pronomos Vase and its Contexts, edited by Oliver Taplin and Rosie Wyles (OUP, 2010)
- Performing Greek Drama in Oxford and on Tour with the Balliol Players, by Amanda Wrigley (University of Exeter Press, 2011)
- Adventures with Iphigenia in Tauris: A cultural history of Euripides' Black Sea tragedy, by Edith Hall (OUP, 2012)
- Black Odysseys: The Homeric Odyssey in the African Diaspora since 1939, by Justine McConnell (OUP, 2013)
- Choruses, Ancient and Modern, edited by Joshua Billings, Felix Budelmann, and Fiona Macintosh (OUP, 2013)
- The Oxford Handbook of Greek Drama in the Americas, edited by Kathryn Bosher, Fiona Macintosh, Justine McConnell, and Patrice Rankine (OUP, 2015)
- Medea, a Performance History, (multimedia ebook) by Fiona Macintosh, Claire Kenward and Tom Wrobel (APGRD, 2016)
- Oscar Wilde and Classical Antiquity, edited by Kathleen Riley, Alaistair J.L. Blanshard and Iarla Manny (OUP, 2017)
- Epic Performances: From the Middle Ages into the Twenty-First Century, edited by Fiona Macintosh, Justine McConnell, Stephen Harrison, Claire Kenward (OUP, 2018)
- Agamemnon, a Performance History, (multimedia ebook) by Fiona Macintosh and Claire Kenward (APGRD, 2020).

== Further references ==
- Martina Treu, Aristofane Sottosopra, a review of the APGRD's 'Aristophanes in Performance' conference, Quaderni di Storia 61 (2005), pp. 283–30.
- Chorus of Approval, Oxford Today: The University Magazine 17.1 (2004), p. 5.
- Detlev Baur, Antikes Theater heute: Kongress in Oxford zur Bühnengeschichte des Agamemnon, a review of the APGRD's Agamemnon conference, Landshuter Zeitung, 20 September 2001.
