= Judith McKenzie (archaeologist) =

Australian archaeologist (1957–2019)

- copyright by Oxford Centre for Late Antiquity
- Born: 28 November 1957; Canberra, Australian Capital Territory, Australia
- Died: 27 May 2019 (aged 61); Oxford, England, United Kingdom
- Occupation: Archaeologist
- Awards: James R. Wiseman Book Award

Academic background
- Education: University of Sydney (BA, PhD)
- Thesis: The Architecture of Petra

Academic work
- Institutions: Faculty of Classics, University of Oxford
- Notable works: The Architecture Of Alexandria And Egypt 300 BC-AD 700; The Architecture of Petra

Judith Sheila McKenzie (28 November 1957 – 27 May 2019) was an Australian archaeologist whose work primarily focused on the architecture of the ancient Middle East. At the time of her death, McKenzie was Associate Professor of Late Antique Egypt and the Holy Land at the University of Oxford and Director of the Manar al-Athar project, an open-access image archive of the Middle East. McKenzie was known in particular for her work on the architecture of Petra and Alexandria, having published lengthy monographs on each.

== Education ==
McKenzie earnt her Bachelor of Arts degree at the University of Sydney; during her BA McKenzie studied Archaeology as well as Chemistry, English and Ancient History. She received her doctorate from the University of Sydney in 1985. McKenzie's doctoral research examined the architectural history of Petra in Jordan; she first visited the site in 1981, and McKenzie spent extended periods living in a cave in Petra. A series of research assistants joined her in the field, including Angela Phippen. After some revisions, McKenzie's thesis was published by Oxford University Press in 1990 as The Architecture of Petra. It was reprinted in 1995 and 2005.

== Career ==
After completing her graduate studies, McKenzie took up residence in Oxford, becoming the Rhys-Davids Junior Research Fellow in 1987. She held this position until 1990, when she became a British Academy Post-doctoral Research Fellow.

Between 2000 and 2002, McKenzie was on the committee of the Palestine Exploration Fund. She was a Queen Elizabeth Fellow at the University of Sydney and a Fellow in Historical Studies at the Institute for Advanced Study in Princeton, New Jersey for the 2003–2004 academic year.

From 2003, McKenzie directed the Khirbet et-Tannur Nabataean Temple Project.

In the late 2000s, McKenzie visited Bir Zeit University in Palestine to give guest lectures. Her experience there, finding that students were unable to visit the sites she lectured on, led to the inception of the Manar al-Athar project. McKenzie established the project in 2012 as an open access image archive of historic sites in the Middle East; she was its director until her death.

McKenzie's 2007 book The Architecture Of Alexandria And Egypt was awarded the James R. Wiseman book award by the Archaeological Institute of America in 2010, which described the monograph as a "a monumental accomplishment". McKenzie's work had been instrumental in understanding how ancient architecture influences later buildings, particularly the influence of the Pharos, the lighthouse of Alexandria.

McKenzie worked on the Garima Gospels, publishing a volume on them with Francis Watson in 2016. The book is the first to reproduce all the illuminated pages in colour. McKenzie also curated an exhibition on the gospels, The Hidden Gospels of Abba Garima, Treasures of the Ethiopian Highland, at the Ioannou Centre, Oxford in 2017. In 2016, she received a European Research Council Advanced Grant for the project Monumental Art of the Christian and Early Islamic East: Cultural Identities and Classical Heritage.

McKenzie died on 27 May 2019 at the age of 61.

== Selected publications ==
=== Books ===
- 1990. The Architecture of Petra. Oxford University Press.
- 2007. The Architecture of Alexandria and Egypt, 300 B.C.–A.D. 700. Pelican History of Art, Yale University Press.
- 2013. J. McKenzie, J. Greene, A.T. Reyes, et al., The Nabataean Temple at Khirbet et-Tannur, Jordan, Volume 1. Architecture and Religion, Annual of the American Schools of Oriental Research 67.
- 2013. J. McKenzie, J. Greene, A.T. Reyes, et al., The Nabataean Temple at Khirbet et-Tannur, Jordan, Volume 2. Cultic Offerings, Vessels, and Other Specialist Reports, Annual of the American Schools of Oriental Research 68.
- 2016. Judith S. McKenzie and Francis Watson The Garima Gospels: Early Illuminated Gospel Books from Ethiopia (University of Exeter Press)

=== Journal articles ===
- 2001. J McKenzie Keys from Egypt and the East: Observations on Nabataean Culture in the Light of Recent Discoveries. Bulletin of the American Schools of Oriental Research No. 324, Nabataean Petra (Nov., 2001): 97–112.
- 2004. J. McKenzie, S. Gibson and A.T. Reyes. Reconstructing the Serapeum in Alexandria from the Archaeological Evidence. Journal of Roman Studies 94: 73–114.
- 2009. The Serapeum of Alexandria: its Destruction and Reconstruction. Journal of Roman Archaeology 22: 772–782.
- 2013. J. McKenzie and A.T. Reyes. The Alexandrian Tychaion, a Pantheon? Journal of Roman Archaeology 26: 36–52.
- 2014. J. McKenzie and S Norodom. From Basel to Alexandria via Sydney Mediterranean Archaeology Vol. 27 (2014): 15–29.
- 2016. J. McKenzie, F. Watson, et al., The Garima Gospels: Early Illuminated Manuscripts from Ethiopia. Oxford.
