= Donna Carol Kurtz =

American classicist

- Education: University of Cincinnati B.A. Yale University M.A. University of Oxford D.Phil.
- Scientific career
- Fields: Greek archaeology and art History of Collections; Digital Cultural Heritage; India and China; Semantic Web/Linked Open Data Machine Learning and AI
- Workplaces: University of Oxford
- Thesis: The iconography of the Athenian white-ground lekythos

Donna Kurtz is an American classicist specializing in Greek art. Born in Cincinnati, Ohio, she took her BA at the University of Cincinnati and her MA as a Woodrow Wilson Scholar at Yale. She read for a DPhil at Somerville College of the University of Oxford with a Marshall Scholarship, which she received in 1968 with her thesis The iconography of the Athenian white-ground lekythos under the supervision of Martin Robertson. This formed the partial basis for her first individual monograph, Athenian white lekythoi: patterns and painters, a standard reference work for the white-ground lekythos.

After the death of Sir John Beazley in 1970, Kurtz organised his books, papers, notebooks, drawings and photographs to form the Beazley Archive, initially kept at the Ashmolean Museum, and was named Beazley Archivist, a chair created for her. The post is connected to Wolfson College, where she remains a fellow.

Her scholarly output, especially in the first decades of her career, focused on Greek pottery. Collaborations with Sir John Boardman on Greek Burial Customs and Brian Sparkes (edd.) on The Eye of Greece: studies in the art of Athens expanded the topics on which she wrote. Her interest in the work of Beazley produced several articles and a posthumous collaboration in The Berlin Painter, which uses Beazley's drawings as the basis of study of anatomy and connoisseurship. From 2000, with the publication of The reception of classical art in Britain: an Oxford story of plaster casts from the antique and the Reception of classical art: an introduction, she has moved into the history of collections more fully.

== Research and Career ==
After competing her D.Phil. she was awarded Junior and then Senior Research Fellowships at Somerville College. She published books and articles while teaching and transforming Beazley’s archive. On creation of the Beazley Archivist post she became associated with Wolfson College. She pioneered the application of emerging digital technologies to Heritage, was among the first in the University of Oxford to share digital research data internationally in electronic/digital form, and participated in four major E.U. R&D projects in telecommunications which enabled her to develop one of the University’s first websites.

== Digital projects ==
From 1979, the Beazley Archive was digitized, in collaboration with IBM and others. Put on-line in 1998, it was one of the earliest large data-sets available; as the Classical Art Research Centre (CARC) it now contains over 100,000 records.

In 2000, Kurtz launched CLAROS, the Classical Art Research Online Services, an umbrella that included the Beazley archive as well as similar archives and research centres across Europe. In 2007, she upgraded the database using semantic web technologies, in collaboration with the Oxford e-Research Centre (where she is now a senior researcher) and the Oxford Internet Institute (where she is now a research associate); the site went live in 2011. It includes not only the original data from the Beazley Archive but also records of eastern ceramics, eastern and western sculpture, gems, drawings and photographs.

From 2013, Kurtz has helmed the Oxford Cultural Heritage Programme, a collaboration between several divisions, incorporating conservation, commerce and law.
