= Bernard Ashmole =

British archaeologist and art historian (1894–1988)

Bernard Ashmole CBE MC
- Ashmole in 1955.
- Born: 22 June 1894; Ilford, Essex, England
- Died: 25 February 1988 (aged 93); Peebles, Scotland
- Occupations: Archaeologist and art historian

Bernard Ashmole CBE MC (22 June 1894 – 25 February 1988) was a British archaeologist and art historian, who specialized in ancient Greek sculpture. He held a number of professorships during his lifetime; Yates Professor of Classical Art and Archaeology at the University of London from 1929 to 1948, Lincoln Professor of Classical Archaeology and Art at University of Oxford from 1956 to 1961, and Greek Art and Archaeology at the University of Aberdeen from 1961 to 1963. He was also Keeper of Greek and Roman Antiquities at the British Museum from 1939 to 1956.

== Early life ==
Ashmole was born on 22 June 1894 in Ilford, Essex, to William Ashmole and Caroline Wharton Tiver. He was a descendant of the antiquarian Elias Ashmole. He was privately educated before attending the private Forest School from 1903 to 1911. He matriculated into Hertford College, Oxford, in 1913, having been awarded the Essex Scholarship in Classics.

== Career ==
=== World War I service ===
With the outbreak of World War I, he left university to join the British Army. He was commissioned into the 11th Battalion, Royal Fusiliers. He was badly wounded at the Battle of the Somme. While recuperating in a service battalion, he was made a temporary captain on 5 November 1916. He returned to the trenches once more, when he was re-attached to the Royal Fusiliers on 9 March 1918. He retained the rank of temporary captain dated to 31 October 1917 with seniority from 5 November 1916.

=== Inter-war period ===
At Oxford he studied with Percy Gardner and John Beazley, with whom he collaborated on the Greek art chapter for the Cambridge Ancient History, 2nd ed. (1928; separately issued, 1930) and whom he eventually succeeded to the Lincoln Chair of Classical Art at Oxford, on Beazley's retirement in 1956.

In 1925–1928 he served as director of the British School at Rome, where he assisted in cataloguing the sculptures of the Palazzo dei Conservatori and developed a feel for modern sculpture and architecture, from the young students at the School. After three years working at the British School at Rome Ashmole was appointed professor of classical archaeology at University College London. He returned to the UK in 1929 to take up the post and commissioned the New Zealand-born architect Amyas Connell to design 'High and Over', a modernist concrete-framed house in Amersham-on-the-Hill, Buckinghamshire. The house is now Grade II* listed for its outstanding architectural importance. The house features in John Betjeman's Metro-land where it is described as 'scandalizing all of Buckinghamshire' and being part of the nascent trend that was to become known as modernism.

His Late Archaic and Early Classical Greek Sculpture in Sicily and South Italy (1934) was developed from his Hertz lectures at the British Academy. In 1939, Ashmole was appointed Keeper of Greek and Roman Antiquities at the British Museum, following a public incident over abrasive cleaning of the Elgin Marbles; there he nurtured the budding careers of two generations of Classical scholars.

=== World War II service ===
In World War II, he served in the Royal Air Force Volunteer Reserve and was given the service number 84365. He was commissioned as a pilot officer (on probation) on 21 July 1940. On 21 July 1941, his commission was confirmed and he was promoted to the war substantive rank of flying officer. He was made a temporary flight lieutenant on 1 September 1942. By January 1944, he was an acting squadron leader. In the next month, he was promoted to flight lieutenant (war substantive) dated 31 August 1943 and to squadron leader (war substantive) dated 5 January 1944. On 10 February 1954, he relinquished his commission, retaining the rank of wing commander.

=== Post World War II ===
He resigned his University of London chair in 1948 to concentrate on the post-war reinstallation of the British Museum. He retired from Oxford in 1961 to accept a chair in Greek Art and Archaeology at the University of Aberdeen, 1961–1963; to be visiting professor at Yale University, 1964, and to give the Taft Lectures, Cincinnati), published as The Classical Ideal in Greek Sculpture (University of Cincinnati, 1964); to give the Wrightsman Lectures in New York (1967, published as Architect and Sculptor in Classical Greece, 1972). He advised the oil billionaire J. Paul Getty on his acquisitions of classical art.

== Personal life ==
In 1920, Ashmole married Dorothy Irene de Peyer. Together they had two daughters and a son.

== Honours and decorations ==
Ashmole was awarded the Military Cross (MC) on 17 April 1917. His citation read:

For conspicuous gallantry and devotion to duty. He displayed great courage and skill in forming his company up for the attack under very heavy fire. Later, although wounded, he continued in command until he was wounded a second time and collapsed.

On 29 December 1942, it was announced that he had been awarded the Greek Distinguished Flying Cross "in recognition of valuable services rendered in connection with the war". On 14 January 1944, it was announced that he had been Mentioned in Despatches.

He was appointed Commander of the Order of the British Empire (CBE) in the 1957 New Year Honours.
