= Isabel Ruffell =

British Classicist

Isabel Ruffell is a British Classicist. She is a Professor of Greek Drama and Culture at the University of Glasgow.

== Education ==
Ruffell received her DPhil. from the Faculty of Literae Humaniores, Oxford University, in 1999. Her doctoral thesis was entitled A Poetics of the Absurd: Reforming Attic Old Comedy. Her supervisor was Oliver Taplin.

== Career and research ==
Following her DPhil, Ruffell was first a lecturer at The Queen's College and Wadham College, University of Oxford and then held a Junior Research Fellowship at Christ Church College. Ruffell's doctoral research was published in 2011 by Oxford University Press as Politics and Anti-realism in Athenian Old Comedy: The Art of the Impossible. Reviews of this book described it as "a novel and systematic approach to humour in Old Comedy" aiming "to explain the complex relationship between humour and politics; [Ruffell] therefore combines theoretical analysis applied to selected close readings with the cognitive responses and the role of the audience", and as a "rich academic study of the intellectual and political context of the plays... Ruffell refreshingly connects Platonic theories of art and letters with familiar cultural references to cinema and television, from Airplane! to Monty Python and South Park". Ruffell has also published a companion to the tragedy Prometheus Bound, praised by a reviewer as "cover[ing] all the bases with well-documented scholarship and eminent fairness to all sides of what has become in the last few decades a very perplexing and controversial drama... does an admirable job of embedding the play within its political and intellectual context", as well as further articles on Greek and Roman comedy, tragedy, and satire; ancient automata; and queer readings of classical literature.

Ruffell's research project Hero of Alexandria and his Theatrical Automata, ran from 2014 until 2018, and was funded by the Leverhulme Trust (£282,881).

In 2007, Ruffell provided the English translation for the National Theatre of Scotland's production of the Bacchae, an ancient Greek tragedy by Euripides. Her translation was adapted by David Greig and directed by John Tiffany. The play opened the Edinburgh International Festival in 2007. Ruffell also provided the literal translation for Grieg's production of Aeschylus' Suppliant Women (2016).

Ruffell is a member of the Council of University Classics Departments' Equality, Diversity & Inclusivity Committee and in 2022 joined the British Committee for the Reunification of the Parthenon Marbles, commenting that "It is morally indefensible for them [the Parthenon Marbles] to be in London".

== Select bibliography ==
- I. Ruffell and L. I. Hau (eds) Truth and History in the Ancient World: Pluralising the Past (London: Routledge, 2016)
- Aeschylus: Prometheus Bound. Companions to Greek & Roman Tragedy (London: Bristol Classical Press, 2012)
- Politics and Anti-realism in Athenian Old Comedy: the Art of the Impossible (Oxford University Press: Oxford, 2011)
