= Leonard Stall =

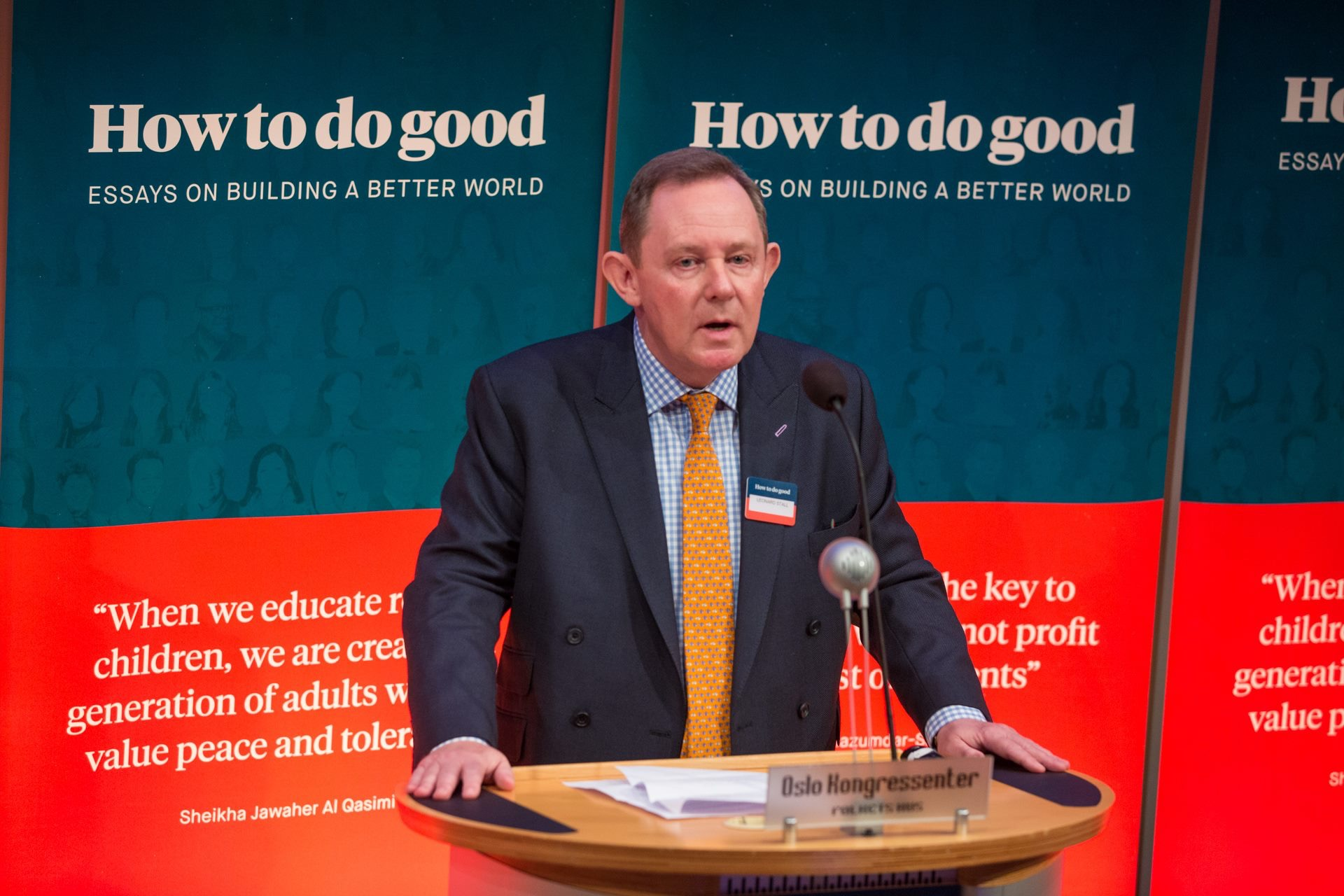
- Born: 8 February 1961 (age 65); London
- Known for: How To Do Good Tour and book, Vision, Philanthropy Age

Leonard Stall (born in London on 8 February 1961) is a media entrepreneur and author.

== Education ==
Stall graduated from The University of Birmingham in Birmingham, United Kingdom in 1982 and was a Press Fellow at Wolfson College, Cambridge (1993).

He was awarded an Honorary Doctorate (DUniv) from The University of Birmingham, United Kingdom, in 2019.

== Career ==
Stall founded Medialab in 1992, where he was responsible for launching and selling a portfolio of magazine and newspaper titles including The Sussex and South Coast edition of The Metro daily newspaper, The Source, Brighton and Hove Life, Business Edge, Retail Express and others. During his time with Medialab, he also launched an online portal for retailers, thelocalshop.com and was a presenter on a national radio show called Early Edition, initially on the GWR network, and then broadcast at breakfast-time on the UK's nationwide Talk Radio.

In 2004, he was appointed as Chairman of the Sussex branch of the Institute of Directors and was also on the SE Regional Committee. He remained in this role until 2007.

In 2008, he joined Touchline as its Group CEO and editor-in-chief.

From 2010 to 2017, at Touchline, he was the editor-in-chief of Vision magazine.

He was also the editor-in-chief of the book How to do Good – Essays on Building a Better World. It was featured in the Dubai Festival of Literature, the York Festival of Ideas and at The University of Birmingham, Stockholm University, City Hall London, The Lincoln Center New York City, and in Oslo, Brussels, The Hague and Paris in 2017.

In 2017, he was appointed as the Executive Chairman of Touchline.

In 2020, he opened a new media and communications company, Just Reports B.V. in the Netherlands.

== Philanthropy and Charity ==
In addition to his roles as both the founder and editor-in-chief of Philanthropy Age, a grantee project of the Bill and Melinda Gates Foundation, and the How to do Good book and speaker tour, Stall led the creation of an independent International Code of Practice for Non-Profit Organisations, a process managed by British Standards Institution (BSI) and co-sponsored by Philanthropy Age and social enterprise Insaan Group.

Stall is an Advisory Board Member for Rosalynn Carter's Fellowships for Mental Health Journalism in UAE.

He is a consultant to the Norwegian Nobel Institute.

Stall chaired Charity Futures, the UK third sector think-tank that worked with New College at the University of Oxford to launch the Gradel Institute of Charity which opened in September 2023. He now sits on the Governing Committee of the new Institute as a Non-Executive.

He also sits on the Global Advisory Board of the Institute of Global Innovation at The University of Birmingham and on the advisory board of the University of Birmingham in Dubai.

Stall is a trustee of the Silverstone Motor Racing Museum on the famous UK motor racing circuit.

== Bibliography ==
- Stall, Leonard (1992). The Good Condom Guide. Robson Books Ltd. ISBN 0860518280.
- Stall, Leonard (1996). The Quest for the Ultimate Grand Slam: Mike Catt's Year. Mainstream Pub Co Ltd. ISBN 1851587888.
- Stall, Leonard (1997). A Whole New Ball Game. Mainstream Pub Co Ltd. ISBN 1851589767.
- Stall, Leonard (2013). Connecting minds creating the future. Dubai Expo 2020. ISBN 978-9948168508.
- How to do good. London Wall Publishing. 2016. ISBN 978-0993291784.
- Stall, Leonard (2020) Conversations about the Planet and our Future. ISBN 9789948356257
- Stall, Leonard (2020) Conversations about People and our Future. ISBN 9789948255628
- Stall, Leonard (2021) Conversations about Innovation and our Future. ISBN 978-9948-8766-0-1
- Stall, Leonard (2022) Conversations about our Future. ISBN 978-9948-8766-1-8

== Other Appointments and memberships ==
- Trustee and long-time chairman of Trustees of UK publishing organisation, ACE
- Fellow Institute of Directors
- Memberships: MCC, Reform Club, Ivy Club
- Chairman of the Sussex branch of the Institute of Directors, member SE Regional Committee 2004–2007
- Member of Court University of Sussex 2004–2007
- Steering Committee for the Theatre Royal Brighton's 200th Birthday 2007
- Trustee Martlets Hospice, Brighton 2005-2007
