= Manar al-Athar =

Photo archive based at the University of Oxford

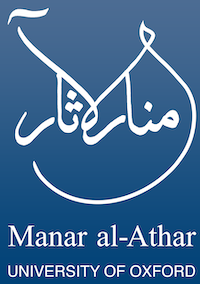
- Formation: 2012; 13 years ago
- Founder: Judith McKenzie
- Type: Open-access photo archive
- Headquarters: Faculty of Classics, University of Oxford
- Director: Ine Jacobs
- Website: https://www.manar-al-athar.ox.ac.uk

Manar al-Athar is a photo archive based at the Faculty of Classics at the University of Oxford which aims to provide high-quality open-access images of archaeological sites and buildings. The archive's collection focuses on areas of the Roman Empire which later came under Islamic rule, namely the Levant, North Africa, Turkey, Georgia and Armenia. As of June 2022, the archive holds more than 83,000 unique images. Particular strengths include Late antiquity, as well as the transition from paganism to Christianity and later to Islam.

The archive licenses its images under a Creative Commons CC BY-NC-SA 2.0 license; the images can be used for any non-commercial purpose, including in academic publications, and are jointly labelled in English and Arabic to encourage usage by academics and students around the world.

== History ==
Manar al-Athar was founded in 2012 by Judith McKenzie, archaeologist and Associate Professor of Late Antique Egypt and the Holy Land at the University of Oxford. Its creation was inspired by McKenzie's experience lecturing at Birzeit University in Palestine; she discovered that her students were not able to visit most of the Palestinian monuments which she was discussing, and thus sought to Manar al-Athar to provide open-access images for such students and academics to use. McKenzie was the Director of Manar al-Athar from its conception until her death in 2019; since 2020, the archive's director has been Ine Jacobs, Associate Professor of Byzantine Archaeology and Visual Culture at the University of Oxford.

== Publications ==
Manar al-Athar sponsors a publication series, and as of June 2022 has published the following works:

- 2019. J Gnisci (ed.) Treasures of Ethiopia and Eritrea in the Bodleian Library, Oxford
- 2018. E Maucaulay-Lewis et al. Bayt Fahri and the Sephardic Palaces of Ottoman Damascus in the Late 18th and 19th Centuries†
- 2016. J. McKenzie and F. Watson, et al. The Garima Gospels: Early Illuminated Gospel Books from Ethiopia
- 2013. J. McKenzie et al. The Nabatean Temple at Khirbet et-Tannur. Volume 2: Cultic Offerings, Vessels and Other Specialist Reports†
- 2013. J. McKenzie et al. The Nabatean Temple at Khirbet et-Tannur. Volume 1: Architecture and Religion†

† indicates works published jointly with the American Schools of Orient Research.
