= Rhiannon Ash =

British classical scholar

Rhiannon Ash is a British classical scholar specialising in Latin literature and Tacitus. She is professor of Roman Historiography in the Faculty of Classics, University of Oxford, and a Fellow of Merton College, Oxford. She was formerly a lecturer at the Department of Greek and Latin at University College, London.

== Career ==
Ash completed undergraduate study at Oxford. She subsequently studied for an MA in Toronto, before obtaining a DPhil from the University of Oxford.

Her primary area of research interest is Latin prose literature of the Imperial Era, especially that of Tacitus, Pliny the Elder, and Pliny the Younger. She has published commentaries on book 15 of the Annals and book 2 of the Histories. She has also written extensively on ancient epistles, Greek and Roman biographies, and battle narratives, among other subjects.

Ash has led research projects funded by UKRI, and in 2017, she was the RD Milns Visiting Professor at the University of Queensland. As well as producing academic scholarship, Ash has written for The Times Literary Supplement.

== Selected publications ==
=== Books ===
- 2009: Tacitus: The Histories (Penguin).
- 2012 (ed.): Oxford Readings in Tacitus (Oxford University Press).
- 2018: Tacitus Annals XV (Cambridge University Press).

=== Book chapters and journal articles ===
- 2009: 'Fission and Fusion: Shifting Roman Identities in Tacitus' Histories', 85-99 in A.J. Woodman (ed.), The Cambridge Companion to Tacitus (Cambridge University Press).
- 2010: 'Fighting Talk: Dillius Vocula's Last Stand (Tacitus Histories 4.58)', 211-31 in D. Pausch (ed), Stimmen der Geschichte: Funktionen von Reden in der antiken Historiographie (De Gruyter).
- 2010: 'Rhoxolani Blues (Tacitus Histories 1.79): Virgil's Scythian Ethnography Revisited', 141-54 in J.F. Miller and A.J. Woodman (eds), Latin Historiography and Poetry in the Early Empire (Brill).
- 2010: 'Tarda Moles Ciuilis Belli: The Weight of the Past in Tacitus' Histories', in Citizens of Discord: Rome and its Civil Wars, 119-31 in B.W. Breed, C. Damon, and A. Rossi (eds.), (Oxford University Press).
- 2010: 'The Great Escape: Tacitus on the Mutiny of the Usipi (Agricola 28)', in Ancient Historiography and its Contexts: Studies in Honour of A.J. Woodman, 275-93 in C.S. Kraus, J. Marincola, and C. Pelling (eds.), (Oxford University Press).
- 2011: 'Pliny the Elder's Attitude to Warfare', 1-19 in R.K. Gibson and R. Morello (eds), Pliny the Elder Themes and Contexts (Brill).
- 2012: 'War Came in Disarray...' (Thebaid 7.616): Statius and the Depiction of Battle', in C. Newlands and W. Dominik (eds), Blackwell Companion to Statius (Blackwell).
- 2012: 'Women in Imperial Roman Literature',442-52 in S. James, S. Dillon (eds), A Companion to Women in the Ancient World (Blackwell).
- 2013: 'Tacitean Fusion: Tiberius the Satirist?', 433-47 in T.D. Papanghelis, S.J. Harrison, and S. Frangoulidis (eds), Generic Interfaces in Latin Literature: Encounters, Interactions, and Transformations (De Gruyter).
- 2014: 'Fractured Vision: Josephus and Tacitus on Triumph and Civil War', in R. Rees and J. Madsen J (eds.) Double Vision (Brill).
- 2014: 'Act like a German! Tacitus' Germania and National Characterisation in the Historical Works’, 183-98 in O. Devillers (ed.), Les opera minora de Tacite: étapes pour l’écriture de l’Histoire (éditions Ausonius).
- 2015: 'At the End of the Rainbow: Nero and Dido's Gold (Tacitus Annals 16.1-3)', 269-84 in R. Ash, J. Mossman and F. Titchener (eds),Fame and Infamy: Essays on Characterization in Greek and Roman Biography and Historiography (Oxford University Press).
- 2015: 'Shadow-Boxing in the East: The Spectacle of Romano-Parthian Conflict in Tacitus', 139-56 in V. Hope and A. Bakogianni (eds.), War as Spectacle (Bloomsbury).
- 2016: 'Tacitus and the Poets: In Nemora et Lucos … Secedendum est (Dialogus 9.6)?', 13-35 in P. Mitsis and I. Ziogas (eds), Wordplay and Powerplay in Latin Poetry (De Gruyter).
- 2016: 'Drip-Feed Invective: Pliny, Self-Fashioning, and the Regulus Letters', in A. Marmodoro and J. Hill (eds), The Author's Voice in Classical Antiquity (Oxford University Press).
- 2016: 'Never Say Die! Assassinating Emperors in Suetonius Lives of the Caesars', in K. De Temmerman and K. Demoen (eds.), Fictional Lives. Ancient Biography and Fictionality, (Cambridge University Press).
- 2017: 'Rhetoric and Roman Historiography', in M. MacDonald (ed.), The Oxford Handbook of Rhetorical Studies (Oxford University Press), 195-204.
- 2021: 'A stylish exit: Marcus Terentius’ Swan-Song (Tacitus, Annals 6.8), Curtius Rufus, and Virgil', Classical Quarterly, vol. 71, 330-46
