= Doğan Kuban =

Turkish architectural historian (1926–2021)

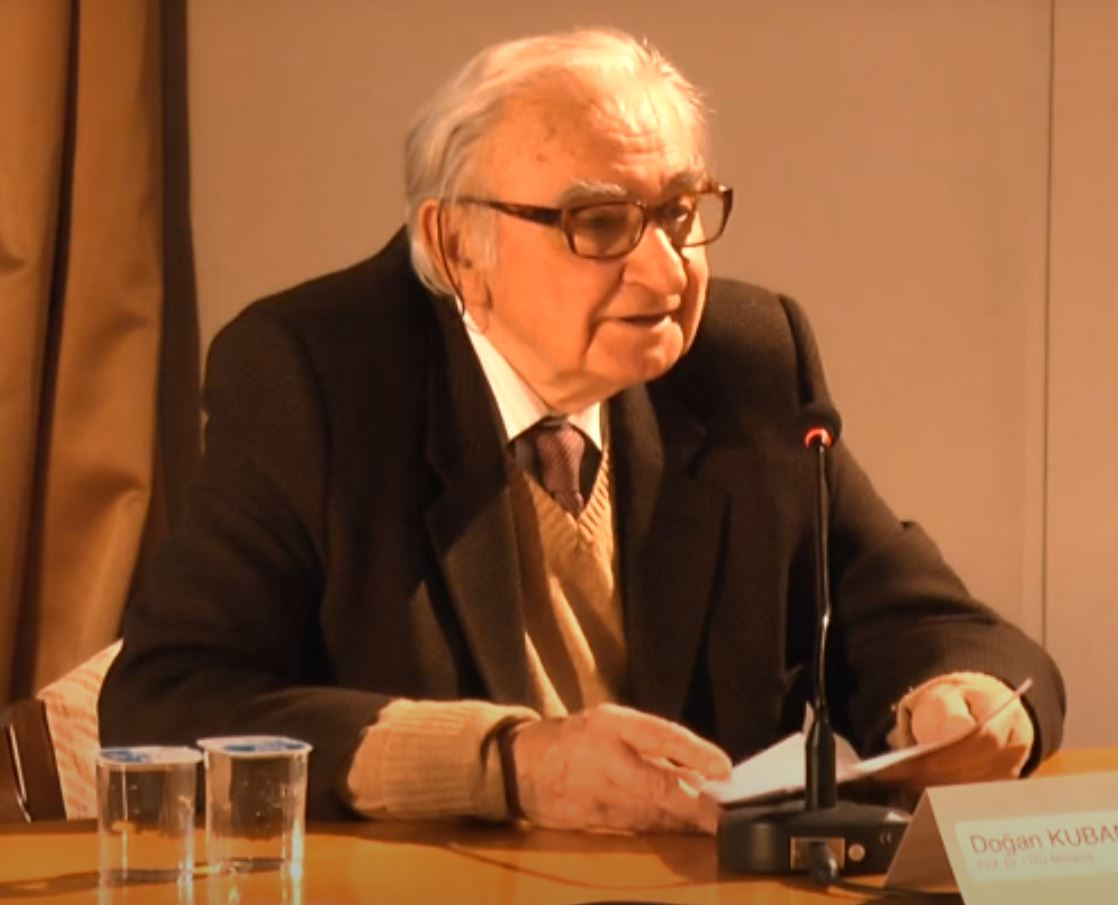
Kuban in 2015.

Doğan Kuban (10 April 1926 – 22 September 2021) was a Turkish architectural historian.

== Biography ==
Kuban was born in Paris.

He received his bachelor's degree in architecture from Istanbul Technical University (ITU). Shortly thereafter he started his academic career. In the 1960s and 1970s he spent time as a research fellow at the Dumbarton Oaks Research Library with a scholarship from Harvard University. He became a professor in 1965, and he retired recently. Among his other work, he aided Professor Cecil L. Striker, of the University of Pennsylvania, in his scholarly restoration of the Kalenderhane Mosque in Istanbul.

Kuban's urban history of Istanbul—one of the more complete diachronic histories of the city—is available in English as Istanbul: An Urban History. Byzantion, Constantinopolis, Istanbul (Istanbul, 1996). He died on 22 September 2021 at the age of 95.

== See also ==
- List of Turkish architects
- Ottoman architecture

== Bibliography ==
- Mimarlık Kavramları (1998) ISBN 975-7438-09-X
- İstanbul Yazıları (1998) ISBN 975-7438-65-0
- Sinan: an Architectural Genius (1999); text by Doğan Kuban, photographs by Ahmet Ertuğ
- İstanbul Bir Kent Tarihi (2000) ISBN 975-333-130-4
- Tarihi Çevre Korumanın Mimarlık Boyutu (2000) ISBN 975-7438-96-0
- Türkiye'de Kentsel Koruma (2001) ISBN 975-333-032-4
