= Ahmet Ertuğ =

Turkish photographer (born 1949)

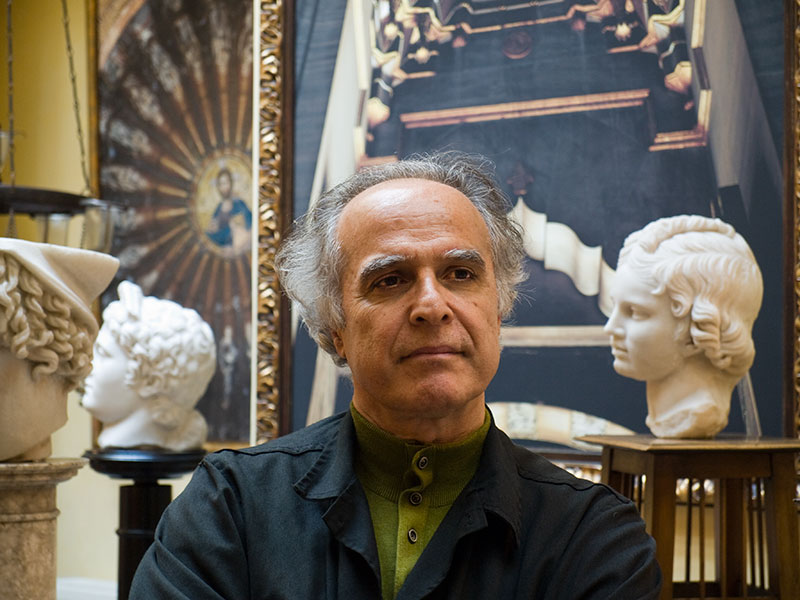
Ahmet Ertuğ

Ahmet Ertuğ (born 1949) is a fine art photographer and publisher based in Istanbul, Turkey.

Ertuğ trained as an architect at the Architectural Association School of Architecture in London, graduating in 1974. He specializes in large format photography of architectural and archaeological edifices of the Hellenistic, Roman, Byzantine and Ottoman periods in the history of Turkey. He uses large format camera equipment and 20 x 25 cm film material, also high resolution digital camera backs in specific locations. With Ahmet Kocabıyık he founded Ertuğ & Kocabıyık: Publishers of Fine Art Books. Ahmet Ertuğ's photographs were published in a series of 25 limited edition volumes, printed and bound manually in Italy and Switzerland. All these books have been published in Folio and larger formats.

In 2009 Ertuğ photographed 30 historical libraries in Europe. He developed the volume Temples of Knowledge: Libraries of the Western World from these photographs. Another photographic project, documenting the architecture of grand opera houses, was published in 2010 under the title Palaces of Music: Opera Houses of Europe, with text written by Michael Forsyth.
Gods of Nemrud: The Royal Sanctuary of Antiochos & the Kingdom of Commagene followed in 2012. The book deals with the archaeological material from Commagene of the first century BC connected to the local kingdom of Antiochus I. Its text was contributed by R.R.R. Smith.

== Selected works ==
- Silks for the Sultans: Ottoman Imperial Garments from Topkapi Palace (1996)
- Hagia Sophia: A Vision for Empires; text by Cyril Mango (1997)
- Gardens of Paradise:16th Century Turkish Ceramic Tile Decoration; text by Walter Denny (1997)
- Sinan: an Architectural Genius; text by Doğan Kuban (1999)
- Anatolian Carpets: Masterpieces from the Turkish and Islamic Arts Museum, Istanbul; text by Walter Denny & Nacan Olcer (1999)
- Chora: The Scrolls of Heaven; text by Cyril Mango (2000)
- Sculptured for Eternity: Treasures of Hellenistic, Roman and Byzantine Art from the Istanbul Archaeological Museum; text by R.R.R. Smith (2001)
- Spirituel Journey: Sacred Art From Musée Guimet; texts written by the curators of the museum (2004)
- Sacred Art of Cappadocia: Byzantine murals from the 6th to 13th Centuries; text by Catherine-Jolivet Levy (2006)
- Ephesos: Architecture, Monuments and Sculpture; text written by members of the Archaeological Institute of Austria (2007)
- Aphrodisias: Roman Asian Architecture, Monuments and Sculpture; text by R.R.R.Smith, director of excavations in Aphrodisias (2008)
- Temples of Knowledge: Libraries of the Western World; text by Friedrich Krizinger (2009)
- Palaces of Music; Opera Houses of Europe; texts by Michael Forsyth and Rolf Sachsse
- Gods of Nemrud: The Royal Sanctuary of Antiochos & the Kingdom of Commagene; text by R.R.R. Smith

== Permanent exhibitions ==
Ahmet Ertuğ's Hagia Sophia photographs can be viewed in the upper northern gallery of the Hagia Sophia in Istanbul as a permanent exhibition. The Ephesos Museum, located in the Hofburg Palace in Vienna, Austria, also permanently displays his works on the subject
