= R. R. R. Smith =

British classicist, archaeologist, and academic

R. R. R. Smith FBA
- Born: Roland Ralph Redfern Smith; 30 January 1954 (age 72)
- Citizenship: United Kingdom

Academic background
- Education: Pembroke College, Oxford; Magdalen College, Oxford
- Thesis: Sculptured portraits of Hellenistic kings c. 330-30 B.C (1983)

Academic work
- Discipline: Classics
- Sub-discipline: Classical archaeology; art history; Hellenistic period; Ancient Rome
- Institutions: Magdalen College, Oxford; Institute of Fine Arts, New York University; Lincoln College, Oxford; Faculty of Classics, University of Oxford; School of Archaeology, University of Oxford; Ashmolean Museum

Roland Ralph Redfern "Bert" Smith, FBA (born 30 January 1954) is a British classicist, archaeologist, and academic, specialising in the art and visual cultures of the ancient Mediterranean. From 1995 to 2022, he was Lincoln Professor of Classical Archaeology and Art at the University of Oxford; now retired, he is an emeritus professor.

== Early life and education ==
Smith was born on 30 January 1954, and was educated at Fettes College, a private school in Edinburgh, Scotland. He studied Literae humaniores (classics) at Pembroke College, Oxford, graduating with a Bachelor of Arts (BA) degree in 1977. Remaining at Pembroke, he studied for a Master of Philosophy (MPhil) degree in classical archaeology, which he completed in 1979. He then moved to Magdalen College, Oxford to continue his studies in classical archaeology, and graduated with a Doctor of Philosophy (DPhil) degree in 1983. His doctoral thesis was titled "Sculptured portraits of Hellenistic kings c. 330-30 B.C".

== Academic career ==
From 1981 to 1986, Smith was a Fellow by Examination in ancient history at Magdalen College, Oxford. He additionally held a Harkness Fellowship at Princeton University between 1983 and 1985. In 1986, he moved to the United States where he had been appointed an assistant professor in classical archaeology at the Institute of Fine Arts, New York University. He taught Hellenistic and Roman archaeology, and art history at the university. He was promoted to associate professor in 1990, and was an Alexander von Humboldt Fellow at the Institut für Klassische Archäologie (Institute of Classical Archaeology) in Munich, Germany for the 1991/92 academic year.

In 1995, Smith returned to the United Kingdom, having been appointed Lincoln Professor of Classical Archaeology and Art at the University of Oxford and elected a Fellow of Lincoln College, Oxford. He is a member of both the Faculty of Classics and of the School of Archaeology. He is additionally Curator of the Cast Gallery of the Ashmolean Museum. In 2022, he retired from full-time academia, and was made an emeritus professor.

== Honours ==
In 2010, Smith was elected a Fellow of the British Academy (FBA), the United Kingdom's national academy for the humanities and social sciences.

== Selected publications ==
- Hellenistic Royal Portraits (Clarendon Press, Oxford 1988)
- Hellenistic Sculpture (Thames & Hudson, London 1991)
- The Monument of C.Julius Zoilos: Aphrodisias I (Philipp von Zabern, Mainz, 1994)
- Sculptured for Eternity: Greek, Roman, and Byzantine Art in the Istanbul Archaeological Museum (with Ahmet Ertuğ, Istanbul 2002)
- Roman Portrait Statuary from Aphrodisias: Aphrodisias II (Philipp von Zabern, Mainz, 2006)
- Aphrodisias: City and Sculpture in Roman Asia (with Ahmet Ertug, Istanbul 2009)
- The Cast Gallery of the Ashmolean Museum: Catalogue of plaster casts of Greek and Roman sculpture (with R. Frederiksen, Oxford 2011)
- The Gods of Nemrud: The Royal Sanctuary of Antiochos I and the Kingdom of Commagene (with Ahmet Ertuğ, Istanbul 2012)
- The marble reliefs from the Julio-Claudian Sebasteion: Aphrodisias VI (Philipp von Zabern, Darmstadt, 2013)
- Ancient Theaters of Anatolia (with Ahmet Ertug, Istanbul 2014)
- Smith, R.R.R.; Ward-Perkins, Bryan, eds. (2016). The last statues of antiquity. Oxford: Oxford University Press. ISBN 978-0198753322.
- R.R.R. Smith et al., Antinous: boy made god (exhibition catalogue), Oxford, Ashmolean Museum, 2018
