= Patrice Rankine =

Academic background
- Education: Yale

Academic work
- Discipline: Classics
- Institutions: University of Richmond
- Website: Dr. Patrice Rankine, Professor of Classics

Patrice Rankine is a Professor of Classics at the University of Chicago. He is a leading scholar in the area of classical reception.

== Early life ==
Patrice Rankine was born in Crown Heights, Brooklyn, New York on September 25, 1971. Son of Jamaican immigrants, he spent his pre-school and first school years in Kingston, Jamaica, before returning to Brooklyn in 1979. He attended public schools in New York City and studied photography at South Shore High School, working with photographer Mitchel Grey during his senior year. Accepted at School of Visual Arts for matriculation in September, 1988, he instead attended Brooklyn College, where he shifted to the study of Ancient Greek. He graduated from Brooklyn College in June, 1992 and attended Yale University in New Haven, Connecticut, from 1992 to 1998, where he earned his M.A., M.Phil., and Ph.D. in Classical Languages and Literatures. He was member of the inaugural class of the Mellon Mays Undergraduate Fellowship (then the Mellon Minority Undergraduate Fellowship). Rankine was one of the first 100 PhDs that the program produced and also attended the 25th anniversary of the program in June, 2014, in Atlanta, Georgia.

== Education ==
He studied for a Bachelor of Arts at Brooklyn College, City University of New York. Subsequently, he received Master of Arts and Master of Philosophy degrees in Classical Languages and Literatures from Yale. Rankine received a Ph.D. in classical languages and literature from Yale University in 1998, on the subject of moral agency in Seneca.

== Career ==
Rankine was assistant head of the School of Languages and Cultures and director of the Interdisciplinary Program in Classics at Purdue University. Rankine was the Dean for the Arts and Humanities at Hope College in Holland, Michigan. Since 2016 Rankine has been the Dean of the School of Arts and Sciences at the University of Richmond, where he also serves as Director of the Arc of Justice Institute, an interdisciplinary diversity and inclusion initiative.

Rankine continues to conduct research on the Greco-Roman classics and its afterlife. Specifically, he explores the relationship between Ralph Ellison and the classical tradition through Classical Reception Studies, where he interrogates both the dynamics of Blacks in Classics, and ‘Black Classicism’ as a notion. He previously served as Dean for the Arts and Humanities at Hope College in Holland, Mich., where he oversaw nine departments and several interdisciplinary programs, including a new museum and music building, and an art gallery.

Rankine has published three books. Ulysses in Black: Ralph Ellison, Classicism, and African American Literature (2006), which received a Choice Magazine Outstanding Academic Title award in 2007, Aristotle and Black Drama: A Theatre of Civil Disobedience (2013) and co-edited The Oxford University Handbook: Greek Drama in the Americas (2015) with Kathryn Bosher, Fiona Macintosh and Justine McConnell.

== Selected publications ==
P. Rankine. 2006. Ulysses in Black: Ralph Ellison, Classicism, and African American Literature. The University of Wisconsin Press.

P. Rankine 2013. Aristotle and Black Drama: A Theater of Civil Disobedience. Waco: Baylor University Press.

P. Rankine 2011. Orpheus and the Racialized Body in Brazilian Film and Literature of the Twentieth Century. Forum for World Literature Studies 3 : 420–433.

P. Rankine 2012. Black is, black ain’t: (Re)imagining Greece, Rome, and Race through Ralph Ellison, Derek Walcott, Wole Soyinka. Revue de Littérature Comparée 344: 457–474.

P. Rankine 2015. Oxford University Handbook: Greek Drama in the Americas, co-editor with Kathryn Bosher, Fiona Macintosh, and Justine McConnell. Oxford University Press, 2015.

P. Rankine 2015 ‘The World is a Ghetto:’ Postracial America(s) and the Apocalypse,” chapter for Houston Baker’s The Trouble with Post-Blackness, Columbia University Press,.

P. Rankine 2016. The Body and Invisible Man: Ralph Ellison’s Novel in Twenty-First Century Performance and Public Spaces,” in The New Territory: Ralph Ellison and the Twenty-First Century, eds. Marc Conner and Lucas E. Morel, University of Mississippi Press.

P. Rankine 2017. Dignity in Homer for Dignity: Oxford Philosophical Concepts, edited by Remy Debes. Oxford University Press: 19–45.

P. Rankine 2018. Aftermath: Du Bois, Classical Humanism, and the Matter of Black Lives. International Journal of the Classical Tradition

P. Rankine 2018. Epic Performance through Invencão de Orfeu and ‘An Iliad:’ Two Instantiations of Epic as Embodiment in the Americas,” in Fiona Macintosh, Justine McConnell, Stephen Harrison, and Claire Kenward (eds.), Epic Performances, from the Middle Ages into the Twenty-First Century. Oxford: Oxford University Press.
