= Edith Hall =

British classics scholar (born 1959)

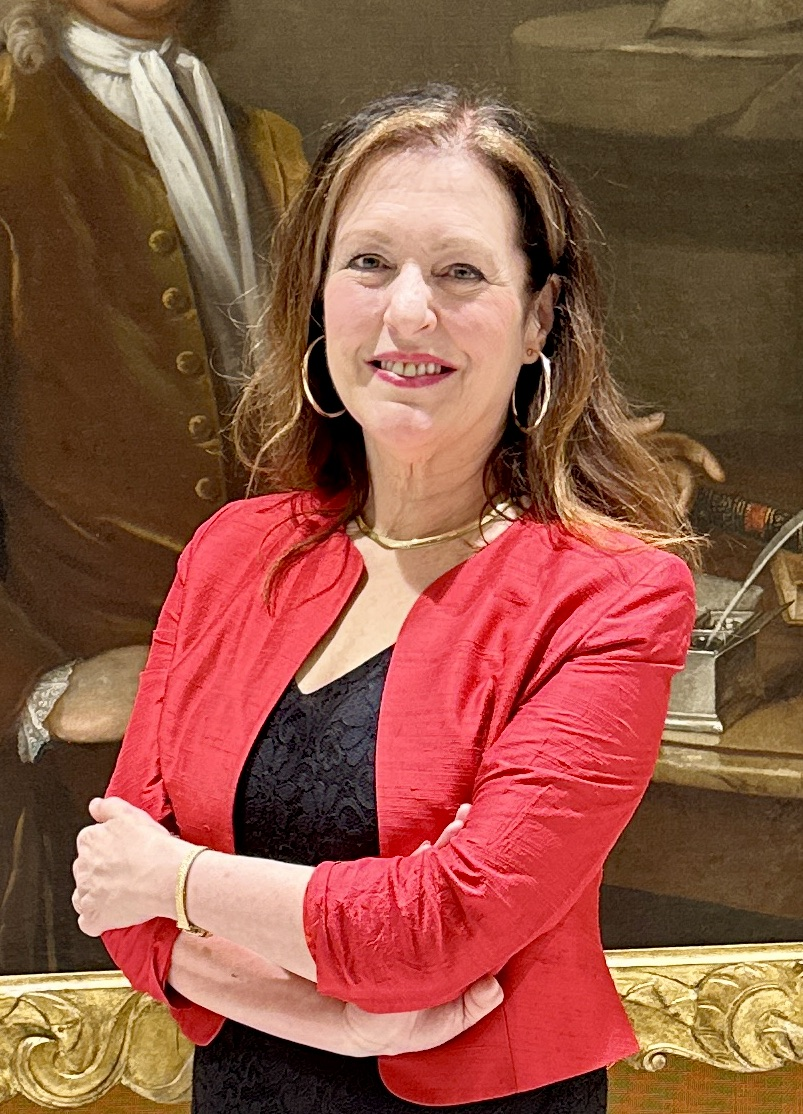
- Hall in 2023
- Born: 4 March 1959 (age 67); Birmingham, England
- Employer: Durham University

Academic background
- Education: Wadham College, Oxford (BA); St Hugh's College, Oxford (DPhil)

Academic work
- Discipline: Classicist
- Main interests: Bringing classics into state schools
- Website: edithhall.co.uk

Edith Hall FBA (born 4 March 1959) is a British scholar of classics, specialising in ancient Greek literature and cultural history, and professor in the Department of Classics and Ancient History at Durham University. She has spoken on the radio and appeared on television as an expert in Ancient Greek society, literature and theatre. Her book Facing down the Furies: Suicide, the Ancient Greeks, and Me (2024, Yale University Press) won the 2024 International Hellenic Prize.

== Education ==
Edith Hall's voice
Recorded May 2012 from the BBC Radio 4 programme In Our Time

Edith Hall was born in Birmingham and attended school in Nottingham. She won a major open scholarship to Wadham College, Oxford, where she studied for a BA degree in classics and modern languages. She gained first-class honours in 1982, and went on to a DPhil degree at St Hugh's College, Oxford, which she completed in 1988. Her doctoral thesis was awarded the Hellenic Foundation Prize.

== Career ==
Hall taught at the University of Reading between 1990 and 1995. She went on to a post at the University of Oxford, where she was a fellow of Somerville College. In 2001, she became Leverhulme Chair of Greek Cultural History at Durham University, and remained in that post until 2006. She then took up a research professorship at Royal Holloway, University of London, in classics, English and drama. She has had visiting scholar roles at institutions including Northwestern University, the University of Leiden and Gresham College. In 2012, she became a professor in the Department of Classics. Since 2022, she has been a professor at Durham University.

During her time at Royal Holloway, she set up and directed the Centre for the Reception of Greece and Rome. She resigned over a dispute about funding for classics after leading a campaign to prevent cuts to, or the closure of, the Royal Holloway classics department. She was quoted as saying: "You cannot have a serious university without the study of the Greeks and Romans, as Terry Eagleton has said. It is a tragedy because we were really building something here."

When a lecturer at Oxford in 1996, Hall co-founded, with Oliver Taplin, the interdisciplinary Archive of Performances of Greek and Roman Drama. The project collects and analyses materials related to the staging and influence of classical plays. The project's ten co-edited volumes, of which Hall is lead editor of seven and contributor to nine, have been described as playing "a pivotal role in establishing the parameters and methodologies of the study of the reception of Classical drama in performance". Greek Tragedy and the British Theatre 1660–1914, by Hall and Fiona Macintosh, came out of the project. It was shortlisted for the Theatre Society Book of the Year Prize, the J. D. Criticos prize and the Runciman Award.

In 2012, Hall was awarded a Humboldt Research Prize to study ancient Greek theatre in the Black Sea.

In 2014, she was elected to the Academia Europaea. She was elected a Fellow of the British Academy in 2022.

== Research ==
Hall researches ancient Greek literature, especially Homer, Greek tragedy, comedy, satyr drama, ancient literary criticism and rhetoric, Herodotus and Xenophon, although her publications discuss many other ancient authors including Lucian, Plutarch, Artemidorus, Menander, Thucydides, Plato and Aristotle, and other ancient evidence including metre and versification, papyri, painted pottery and inscriptions. She is an expert on classical reception – the ways in which ancient culture and history have informed later epochs, whether in later antiquity or modernity, and whether in fiction, drama, cinema, poetry, political theory, or philosophy. Her research has been influential in three areas: the understanding of the performance of literature in the ancient theatre and its role in society, the representation of ethnicity; the uses of Classical culture in European education, identity, and political theory.

=== Ancient theatre and society ===
Several of her books argue that theatre plays an important role in intellectual and cultural history, especially because entertainments reach lower-status audiences. These include Greek and Roman Actors (2002, with P. E. Easterling), and The Theatrical Cast of Athens (2006), which incorporates a revisiting of Inventing the Barbarian in the light of developments in international history since 1989. New Directions in Ancient Pantomime (2008), the first study of the performance of mythological narratives which educated mass audiences across the ancient Mediterranean world for several centuries, was praised by Denis Feeney, professor of Latin at Princeton University, as "indispensable for all students of the Roman Empire". Her book, Greek Tragedy: Suffering under the Sun, argues that Greek tragedy is a philosophical medium, includes an essay on every surviving ancient Greek tragedy and has been described as "admirably exhaustive". Her 2013 book Adventures with Iphigenia in Tauris: A Cultural History of Euripides' Black Sea Tragedy is a history of the impact of a tragedy by Euripides, covering its presence in vase-painting, Aristotle, Latin poetry, Pompeian murals, Roman imperial sarcophagi and literature including the ancient novel and Lucianic dialogue.

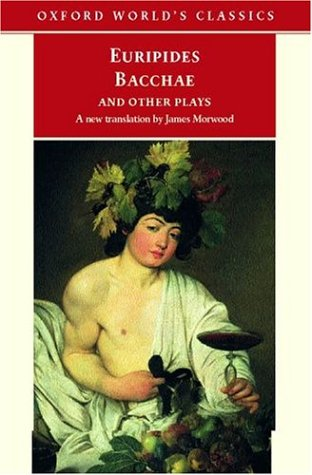
Bacchae and Other Plays by Euripides. Introduction by Edith Hall, trans. Morwood. Oxford World's Classics 2000

From 1996 to 2003, Hall contributed to the Oxford World's Classics Euripides series, which included all nineteen of Euripides' extant plays, newly translated by James Morwood and Robin Waterfield. Hall provided the introductions to each of the five volumes, drawing out the modern parallels with the texts. In the introduction to Bacchae and Other Plays, she explored Euripides' supposed "radicalism", quoting the critic F. L. Lucas: "not Ibsen, not Voltaire, not Tolstoi ever forged a keener weapon in defence of womanhood, in defiance of superstition, in denunciation of war, than the Medea, the Ion, the Trojan Women".

=== Ethnicity ===
Hall's first monograph, Inventing the Barbarian (1989), argued that ancient European identity relied on the stereotyping as 'other' of an Asiatic enemy. Her argument that ancient ideas about ethnicity underlie modern questions of nationalism, racism and ethnic self-determination has been influential in classics, and regarded as "seminal" by scholars in other fields. This work was developed in her scholarly commentary on the Greek text of Aeschylus' Persians, with English translation (1996), and in the essay collection she edited Cultural Responses to the Persian Wars (2007).

=== Classics and society ===
Hall's research has incorporated later cultural history, especially the social role played by the presence of ancient Greece and Rome. Her books in this area include The Return of Ulysses: a Cultural History of Homer's Odyssey (2008), noted by The New York Times for its scholarship and accessibility. This was followed by two collections of essays on ancient slavery and one on the uses and abuses of Greek and Roman texts and ideas in the relationship between India and Britain 1757 to 2007.

Hall is the principal investigator for The People's History of Classics, a project which presents and amplifies the voices of British working-class women and men who engaged with ancient Greek and Roman culture between 1789 and 1917. This developed from a research project based at King's College London, called Classics and Class in Britain 1789–1917. Hall (together with Henry Stead) delivered the Manchester Literary and Philosophical Society Wilde Lecture, on 4 November 2013 on the topic "Is the Study of the Greek and Latin Classics Elitist?" and she delivered the J. P. Barron Memorial Lecture at the Institute of Classical Studies in 2017 on Classicist Foremothers and Why They Matter. She advocates the teaching of classics, including classical civilisation as well as languages, in British state schools.

== Television and radio work ==
Known for her humorous style of lecturing, Hall has made television and radio appearances, as well as acting as consultant for professional theatre productions by the National Theatre, Shakespeare's Globe, the Royal Shakespeare Company, Live Theatre in Newcastle, and Theatercombinat in Germany. In January 2014 she appeared on BBC Two's Newsnight and recited a newly-discovered poem of Sappho in ancient Greek.

== Personal life ==
Hall has been married and divorced, and has two daughters with her second husband, writer Richard Poynder. She has had family members die by suicide, and has written about this in Facing down the Furies: Suicide, the Ancient Greeks, and Me (2024). Rowan Williams, writing in the New Statesman, called it a "remarkable, brave and compassionate book".

== Selected publications ==
- Inventing the Barbarian: Greek Self-Definition through Tragedy (Oxford University Press (OUP), 1989)
- Sophocles' Antigone, Oedipus the King, Electra (OUP, 1994)
- Aeschylus' Persians: Edited with translation and commentary (1996)
- Medea in Performance (Legenda, 2000)
- Dionysus since 69: Greek Tragedy at the Dawn of the Third Millennium (2004)
- Greek Tragedy and the British Theatre 1660–1914 (2005, with Fiona Macintosh)
- The Theatrical Cast of Athens: Interactions between Ancient Greek Drama & Society (2006)
- Agamemnon in Performance (Oxford University Press, 2007)
- Cultural Responses to the Persian Wars (OUP, 2007, with Emma Bridges and P. J. Rhodes)
- Aristophanes in Performance (Legenda, 2007)
- The Return of Ulysses: A Cultural History of Homer's Odyssey (2007)
- New Directions in Ancient Pantomime (2008, with Rosie Wyles)
- Sophocles and the Greek Tragic Tradition (Cambridge University Press (CUP), 2009, with Simon Goldhill)
- Greek Tragedy: Suffering Under the Sun (OUP, 2010)
- Theorising Performance (Duckworth, 2010)
- Reading Ancient Slavery (Bloomsbury, 2010)
- India, Greece and Rome 1757–2007 (Institute of Classical Studies, 2010)
- Ancient Slavery and Abolition (Oxford University Press, 2011)
- Adventures with Iphigenia in Tauris: A Cultural History of Euripides' Black Sea Tragedy (OUP, 2013)
- Introducing the Ancient Greeks: From Bronze Age Seafarers to Navigators of the Western Mind (W. W. Norton, 2014)
- Women Classical Scholars: Unsealing the Fountain from the Renaissance to Jacqueline de Romilly (OUP, 2016, with Rosie Wyles)
- Aristotle's Way: How ancient wisdom can change your life (The Bodley Head, London, 2018) (Penguin, 2020, ISBN 978-0735220829)
- A People's History of Classics: Class and Greco-Roman Antiquity. Co-authored with Henry Stead. Routledge, 2020, ISBN 978-0367432362
- Tony Harrison: Poet of Radical Classicism. Bloomsbury, 2021, ISBN 9781474299336
- Aeschylus' Agamemnon, edited with translation, introduction and commentary. Aris & Phillips, 2024, ISBN 9781836244295
- Facing down the Furies: Suicide, the Ancient Greeks, and Me. Yale University Press, 2024, ISBN 978-0300281927
- Epic of the Earth: Reading Homer’s Iliad in the Fight for a Dying World. Yale University Press, 2025, ISBN 978-0300275582
- A Very Short Introduction to Sophocles. OUP, 2025, ISBN 9780192897800
- Classical Civilisation and Ancient History in British Secondary Education, co-authored with Arlene Holmes-Henderson, Liverpool University Press, 2025, ISBN 9781800856080
- Time, Tense and Genre in Ancient Greek Literature. Co-edited with Connie Bloomfield-Gadêlha. Oxford University Press, 2025, ISBN 9780192858498
- Medea: A Life. Yale University Press. 2026. ISBN 978-0-300-27072-3.
