= Fiona Macintosh =

Classics professor at Oxford University

- Born: 1959
- Education: University of Leeds; King's College London
- Occupations: Professor; university teacher; classical philologist; literary scholar
- Awards: honorary doctorate of University Grenoble-Alpes (2022)
- Scientific career
- Fields: Classical reception studies
- Workplaces: University of Oxford; Archive of Performances of Greek and Roman Drama; University of Oxford
- Doctoral advisor: Michael Silk
- Website: www.classics.ox.ac.uk/people/professor-fiona-macintosh

Fiona Macintosh is professor of classical reception at the University of Oxford, director of the Archive of Performances of Greek and Roman Drama, curator of the Ioannou Centre, and a Fellow of St Hilda's College, Oxford.

== Career ==
Macintosh gained her BA in English and Greek civilisation at the University of Leeds in 1980. She remained at Leeds for her MA in English literature, awarded in 1981. Macintosh moved to King's College, London for her PhD in classics and comparative literature, which was awarded in 1990.

Macintosh was a lecturer in English at Goldsmiths’ College, University of London until 2000, when she moved to Oxford as senior research fellow at the APGRD. She was reader in Greek and Roman drama from 2008 to 2014, when she became professor of classical reception. Macintosh became the director of the APGRD in January 2010.

Macintosh's research focuses on the adaptation of Greek plays for the modern theatre and the reception of Greek tragedy from the Enlightenment to the present day. She has taken a particular interest in the adaptation of Greek tragedy for the Irish stage and has interviewed Frank McGuinness on the subject and discussed with Wayne Jordan his adaptation of Oedipus for the Abbey Theatre, Dublin, in 2015. Macintosh has also researched adaptations of Antigone for the Irish stage.

Macintosh frequently appears on discussion panels and at public events to examine the re-staging of Greek drama today, such as at the York Festival of Ideas in 2018, speaking at the SAS in 2016, debating at the Royal Shakespeare Company in 2015, the Oxford Literary Festival in 2014.

Macintosh was invited to deliver the keynote lecture "From hearth to Hades: adventures with Medea and ballet d'action" at the international symposium "Placing Medea: Transfer, Spatiality, and Gender in Europe 1750−1800", at Uppsala University on April 25, 2018.

Macintosh will deliver the 2018–19 Sigmund H. Danziger Jr. Memorial Lecture in the Humanities on 17 May 2019 at the University of Chicago.

Macintosh has been at the forefront of exploring the potential of presenting research in interactive multimedia ebooks, publishing performance histories that showcase digitised archival material and newly commissioned films, art, audio, and audio-visual material. The earliest fruit of this exploration has been the e-book Medea, a performance history , published by the APGRD in 2016. A second e-book, dedicated to the performance history of Aeschylus' Agamemnon, is forthcoming (2019).

== Selected publications ==
- Dying Acts: Death in Ancient Greek and Modern Irish Tragic Drama (Cork University Press, 1994)
- Medea in Performance (2000)
- Sophocles' Oedipus Tyrannus (Cambridge University Press, 2009)
- with Edith Hall Greek Tragedy and the British Theatre 1660–1914 (Oxford University Press, 2005)
- with Claire Kenward and Tom Wrobel Medea, a performance history (APGRD 2016), an interactive/multimedia ebook
- ed. with Justine McConnell, Stephen Harrison, Claire Kenward Epic Performances from the Middle Ages into the Twenty-First Century (Oxford University Press, 2018)
