= Christopher Howgego =

Numismatist

Academic work
- Discipline: Numismatics
- Sub-discipline: Greek and Roman numismatics
- Institutions: University of Oxford; Wolfson College, Oxford (Fellow); Ashmolean Museum

Professor Christopher Howgego is a British numismatist and academic, who has been the keeper of the Heberden coin room at the Ashmolean Museum from 2006 to 2023. He was also a Fellow of Wolfson College, Oxford, and Professor of Greek and Roman Numismatics at the University of Oxford from 1988 until 2022.
