= Greek Tragedy and the British Theatre 1660–1914 =

Book about theatre by Edith Hall and Fiona Macintosh

Greek Tragedy and the British Theatre 1660–1914 is a non-fiction book by Edith Hall and Fiona Macintosh. It was published in 2015 by Oxford University Press. The book covers the period from the British Restoration to the early twentieth century.

== See also ==
- The Cambridge History of British Theatre
- London theatre closure 1642
- King's Men § Aftermath for the history of one company affected by the prohibition
- William Robbins an actor who lost his living, and fought and died for the Royalist cause.
- Antitheatricality 16th and 17th century
- English Renaissance theatre
- Theatre of Scotland
