= Oliver Taplin =

British classical scholar (born 1943)

Oliver Taplin, FBA (born 2 August 1943) is a retired British academic and classicist. He was a fellow of Magdalen College and Professor of Classical Languages and Literature at the University of Oxford. He holds a DPhil from Oxford University.

== Academic career ==
Taplin's primary focus as a scholar is Greek drama, especially from the viewpoint of staging and performance. His first book (based on his dissertation) was The Stagecraft of Aeschylus, in which he dealt with the entrances and exits of characters in Aeschylus's plays. Subsequent books, including Comic Angels (1993) and Pots and Plays (2007) examine vase paintings as evidence for the performance of tragedy and comedy. In 1996, together with Edith Hall, he set up the APGRD (Archive of Performances of Greek and Roman Drama). It is devoted to the international production and reception of ancient plays since the Renaissance. He has also worked with productions in the theatre, including The Oresteia at the National Theatre (1980–81), The Thebans at the RSC (1991–92), and The Oresteia at the National Theatre (1999–2000).

Apart from Greek drama, his chief area of interest is Homer. Taplin was doctoral supervisor for Classicist Isabel Ruffell.

Among the general public, Taplin is probably best known for Greek Fire, a celebration of the capacity of Ancient Greek culture to stand the test of time and influence modern art, thought and society. The book accompanied a Channel 4 documentary series of the same name. The book has been translated into five languages. In 2008, Taplin took part in the programme "Greek and Latin Voices" for the BBC where he gave a talk on Homer and translated the Homeric texts for the programme.

Taplin retired as Tutor in Classics at Magdalen College, Oxford in 2008. The same year, Oxford University Press published Performance, Iconography, Reception: Studies in Honour of Oliver Taplin, edited by Martin Revermann and Peter Wilson.

== Honours ==
Taplin was elected Fellow of the British Academy (FBA) in 1995.

== Selected publications ==
- The Stagecraft of Aeschylus: the Dramatic Use of Exits and Entrances in Greek Tragedy, Clarendon Press, Oxford, 1977.
- Greek Tragedy in Action, Oxford University Press, Oxford, 1978 (2nd Edition 2003).
- Greek Fire, Cape, London, 1989.
- Homeric Soundings. The Shaping of the Iliad, Oxford, 1992.
- Comic Angels: and Other Approaches to Greek Drama Through Vase-Paintings, Clarendon Press, Oxford, 1993.
- 'Opening Performance: Closing Texts?', Essays in Criticism, 45, 93–120, 1995.
- 'The Artistic Record'. In P.E. Easterling (ed.), The Cambridge Companion to Greek Tragedy, Cambridge, 69–90, 1997.
- 'Spreading the word through performance'. In S. Goldhill and R. Osborne (eds.), Performance Culture and Athenian Democracy, Cambridge, 33–57, 1999.
- (editor) Literature in the Greek and Roman Worlds. A New Perspective, Clarendon Press, Oxford, 2000.
- Pots and Plays. Interactions between Tragedy and Greek Vase-painting of the Fourth Century BC, Getty Museum Publications, Los Angeles, 2007.
- Tragic life-journeys and real-life journeys: the place where three ways meet, Inaugural William Ritchie Memorial Lecture, University of Sydney, 2008. (podcast of lecture)
- (co-editor) The Pronomos Vase and its Context, Oxford, 2010.
- The Oresteia, Liveright, New York, 2018.

== See also ==
APGRD (Archive of Performances of Greek and Roman Drama)
