= John Boardman (art historian) =

British classical archaeologist (1927–2024)

Sir John Boardman OBE FBA
- Boardman c. 2010
- Born: 20 August 1927; Ilford, England, United Kingdom
- Died: 23 May 2024 (aged 96); Woodstock, England, United Kingdom
- Occupation: Classical archaeologist
- Awards: Kenyon Medal; Onassis Prize for Humanities

Academic background
- Education: Chigwell School; Magdelene College, Cambridge

Sir John Boardman, OBE, FBA (/ˈbɔːrdmən/; 20 August 1927 – 23 May 2024) was a British classical archaeologist and art historian of ancient Greek art. Educated at Chigwell School in Essex and at Magdalene College, Cambridge, Boardman worked as assistant director of the British School at Athens between 1952 and 1955 before taking up a position as an assistant keeper at the Ashmolean Museum, part of the University of Oxford. He succeeded John Beazley as Lincoln Professor of Classical Archaeology and Art at the university in 1978, remaining in post until his retirement in 1994.

Boardman's academic work focused on the art and archaeology of ancient Greece, with a particular focus on Greek colonisation, jewellery and vase-painting. He was made a Fellow of the British Academy, which awarded him its Kenyon Medal in 1995. He was also awarded the Onassis Prize for Humanities in 2009.

== Personal life and education ==
Boardman was born in Ilford, Essex, on 20 August 1927. He was educated at Chigwell School (1938–1945); then Magdalene College, Cambridge, where he read Classics beginning in 1945. After completing two years' national service in the Intelligence Corps he spent three years in Greece, from 1952 to 1955, as the Assistant Director of the British School at Athens. He married Sheila Stanford in 1952 (died 2005), and had two children. He died in Woodstock, Oxfordshire, on 23 May 2024, at the age of 96.

== Career ==
On his return to England in 1955, Boardman took up the post of Assistant Keeper at the Ashmolean Museum in Oxford, thus beginning his lifelong affiliation with it. In 1959 he was appointed Reader in Classical Archaeology in the University of Oxford, and in 1963 was appointed a Fellow of Merton College. There he remained until his appointment as Lincoln Professor of Classical Art and Archaeology, a position previously held by John Beazley, and the concomitant Fellowship of Lincoln College in 1978. He was knighted in 1989 and retired in 1994, and was thereafter Emeritus Professor.

Boardman was a Fellow of the British Academy, from which he received the Kenyon Medal in 1995. He was awarded the Onassis Prize for Humanities in 2009. He was an Honorary Fellow of Magdalene College, Cambridge, and of Merton and Lincoln Colleges in Oxford, as well as the holder of many other academic distinctions. He carried out archaeological excavations at many sites, including in Smyrna, Crete, Emporio on Chios and at Tocra in Libya. His voluminous publications focus primarily on the art and architecture of ancient Greece, particularly sculpture, engraved gems and painted vases.

Boardman wrote the book The Greeks Overseas, on the ancient Greek diaspora throughout the Mediterranean, in which Greek populations from the Aegean region, Greek coastal mainland and Western Turkey settled the coastal regions of Italy, North Africa, southern France, reaching as far as southern Spain. The book has now undergone four editions, as new archaeological research emerges.

== Selected publications ==
- The Cretan Collection in Oxford (1961)
- Excavations at Emporio, Chios (1964)
- The Greeks Overseas (1st ed. 1964; rev. ed. 1973; 3rd ed. 1980; 4th ed. 1999)
- Excavations at Tocra (with J. Hayes, 1966, 1973)
- Archaic Greek Gems (1968)
- Greek Gems and Finger Rings (1970, 2001)
- Greek Burial Customs (1971) with D.C. Kurtz
- The Diffusion of Classical Art in Antiquity
- Persia and the West (2000)
- The History of Greek Vases (2001)
- The Archaeology of Nostalgia (2002)
- Greece and the Hellenistic World (2002)
- The World of Ancient Art (2006)
- The Marlborough Gems (2009)
- The Relief Plaques of Central Asia and China (2009/10)
- The Triumph of Dionysos (2014)
- The Greeks in Asia (2015)
- Greek Art, 'The World of Art Library' series (first ed. 1964; latest ed. 2016)
- Alexander the Great: From His Death to the Present Day (2019)

== Sources ==
- Who's Who, 2006.
- Dictionary of Art Historians:Boardman, John
- Beazley Archive
