= Lincoln Professor of Classical Archaeology and Art =

Endowed chair in archaeology

The Lincoln Professor of Classical Archaeology and Art is a chair at the University of Oxford, England. It is associated with Lincoln College, Oxford.

== Holders of the Chair ==
- William Mitchell Ramsay (1885 to 1886); first incumbent
- Percy Gardner (1887 to 1925)
- John Beazley (1925 to 1956)
- Bernard Ashmole (1956 to 1961)
- Martin Robertson (1961 to 1978)
- John Boardman (1978 to 1994)
- Roland Smith (1995 to 2022)
- Athena Tsingarida (from 2026)

== See also ==
- List of professorships at the University of Oxford
