= York Festival of Ideas =

Cultural festival in York, England

Coordinates: 53.94659°N 1.0525°W

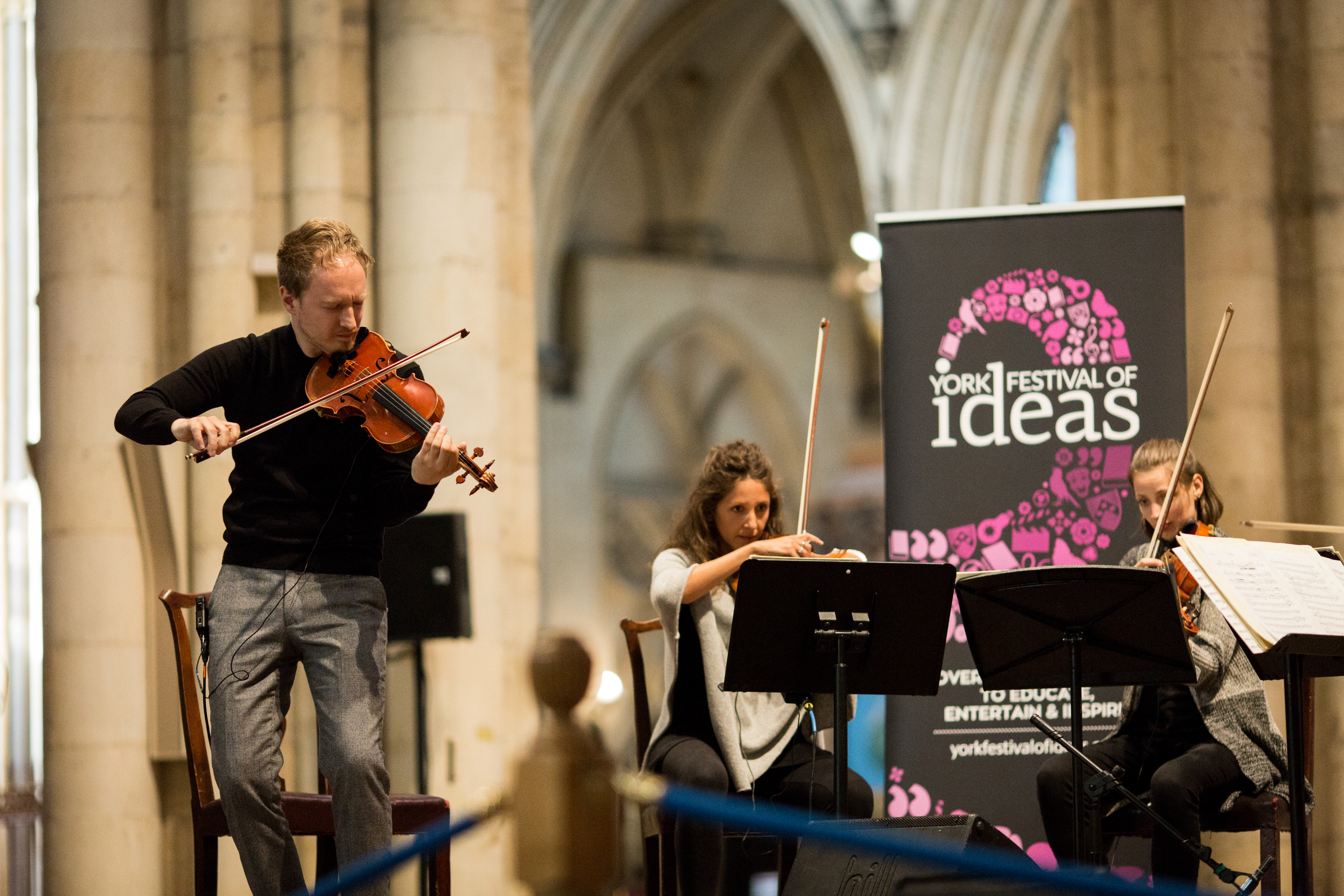
- Performance in York Minster at the 2018 festival
- Genre: Arts, humanities, science, literature, etc.
- Dates: Each June
- Locations: York, England – Betty's, York, JORVIK Viking Centre, King's Manor, Merchant Adventurers' Hall, National Centre for Early Music, York Minster, University of York, York St John University, etc.
- Years active: 2011–present
- Website: York Festival of Ideas

York Festival of Ideas is a cultural festival in York which runs for two weeks every year in June. Launched in 2011 as a partnership between the University of York and major cultural organisations in the city including York Theatre Royal, York Museums Trust, the National Centre for Early Music and the Joseph Rowntree Foundation, it has since expanded to incorporate many more organisations not only from around the city but also from across the UK.

It is one of the largest free festivals of its kind in the UK, and is made possible by the generosity of a range of supporters and donors.

Every year the festival offers speakers, exhibitions, performances, guided tours and family-friendly activities, with topics ranging from history to politics to psychology and many more.

In 2025, the Festival delivered 263 events to a local and worldwide audience of over 54,000, working in collaboration with 130 local, national and international partners and supporters.

== Festivals ==
=== 2011 – Beckett, the Body and the Bible ===
The 2011 pilot festival consisted of over 20 events across the city of York. The themes for the first Festival were Beckett, the Body and the Bible. The Festival included events with two novelists powerfully influenced by Beckett's work – John Banville and the Nobel Laureate J. M. Coetzee, in addition to theatre performances by the internationally renowned Gare St Lazare Players.The Festival of Ideas in 2011 was a partnership between the University of York, York Theatre Royal, The National Centre for Early Music and York Museums Trust.

=== 2012 – Metamorphoses ===
The overarching theme for the 2012 Festival was Metamorphoses, which included major topic areas such as the perils and perceptions of ageing; how conflict transforms lives; architecture as a catalyst for social, cultural and economic progress, and the turbulence of financial markets. The programme also included a Science out of the Lab event in the city centre; a New Writers’ Day; a variety of exhibitions, musical performances and concerts, and international speakers such as Anthony Horowitz and Jung Chang.

=== 2013 – North and South ===
York Festival of Ideas 2013 was organised around the theme North and South. Celebrating York's status as 'capital of the North', the Festival explored, questioned and celebrated ideas of 'North', both as a stand-alone idea, and in direct comparison with ideas of 'South'. Festival events explored ideas of cultural identity, health, food, women, technology and architecture.

The programme provided a wide variety of events including debates as part of BBC Radio 3's Free Thinking Festival; a New Writers’ day with Granta Magazine's Best of Young British Novelists List; Festival Focus days on architecture and design and the economy; a variety of exhibitions, musical performances from national and international performers, hands-on activities and workshops, and headline addresses by speakers such as Melvyn Bragg, Heidi Thomas, Brian Sewell, William Sitwell, Michael Wood, Ross Noble, Michael Scott, Zoe Williams, Harriet Sergeant and Seamus Heaney, in what was one of his last public appearances before his death.

In addition, the University of York and the York Festival of Ideas hosted the Royal Academy of Engineering Summer Soiree Exhibition on 27 June attended by the Princess Royal, in her capacity as Patron of the Royal Academy of Engineering. This included a major exhibition entitled, Engineering: Design for Living, which showcased research across a range of disciplines from literature and advances in computer science, to the emergence of 'personalised' medicine, to demonstrate the way in which engineering ingenuity has and is influencing and improving the way in which we live our lives.

The 2013 York Festival of Ideas included more than 120 events, with 35 organisations co-delivering events under the Festival of Ideas banner. These included the British Library, BBC Radio 3, Granta Magazine, The Institute of Engineering and Technology, The Joseph Rowntree Foundation, York Museums Trust, Bettys and Taylors of Harrogate, and York Minster, to name but a few.

York Festival of Ideas was shortlisted for the Times Higher Education Awards 2013.

=== 2014 – Order and Chaos ===
The 2014 Festival theme Order and Chaos provided subjects including arts and society, conflict and resolution, the future of food, maps and exploration, healthcare, science and religion, economic growth, the ancient world and the mysteries of our brain.

The programme provided a wide variety of events including panel debates on the world's response to global crises, and on detective writing; Festival Focus days on economic growth, religion and science, the future of food, and detective writing; a variety of exhibitions, musical and theatrical performances from national and international performers, hands-on activities and workshops, and headline addresses by speakers such as Jung Chang, Michael Morpurgo, Anthony Horowitz, Charlie Higson, Hermione Lee, James Rubin, and Gavin Esler.

The 2014 York Festival of Ideas consisted of over 140 events. More than 45 organisations co-delivered events under the Festival of Ideas banner in 38 venues around the city. These included the British Library, Castle Howard, Prospect magazine, The Institute of Engineering and Technology, The Joseph Rowntree Foundation, York Museums Trust, Bettys and Taylors of Harrogate, Chatham House, Tate Britain, and York Minster, to name but a few.

=== 2015 – Secrets and Discoveries ===
More than 150 events were delivered under the 2015 Festival theme Secrets and Discoveries between 9 and 21 June. 45 organisations co-delivered events under the Festival of Ideas banner in 50 venues. These included Waterstones, Joseph Rowntree Society, Bettys, York Minster, National Railway Museum, York Museums Trust and National Centre for Early Music. The events encompassed art and design, the economy and equality, food and health, performance and poetry, the past and the future, security and surveillance, truth and trust, technology and the environment, and much more. Headline speakers included Michael Morpurgo, Sir Christopher Frayling, Claire Wilcox, Andrew Davies, Richard Davies, Polly Toynbee, and Peter Murray. Festival Focus days focused on the sub-themes of Curiouser and Curiouser, The Future of Food, The Future of Democracy and Economic Growth, and Surveillance, Snowden and Security.

=== 2016 – Tick Tock ===
The 2016 York Festival of Ideas, with the theme of Tick Tock, contained more than 180 events involving inspirational speakers, performers and exhibitions, such as Sara Pascoe, Owen Jones, Zoe Williams, John Kay, Stephanie Flanders, Ruth Davies, Lynsey Hanley, Alan Travis, Princess Vittoria Alliata, Rear Admiral Chris Parry, Lyse Doucet, and Baroness McIntosh. Festival partners included Classic FM, BBC History Magazine, Joseph Rowntree Foundation, Quorn Foods, Aviva, and Shepherd Group. Subjects explored included living with floods, the future of food, equality, Europe, minds and bodies, and fragile states.

=== 2017 – The Story of Things ===
The 2017 York Festival of Ideas took place from 6 to 18 June with the theme The Story of Things in celebration of human ingenuity and invention.

Headline speakers included Peter Lord, Co-founder and Creative Director of Aardman, cleric and broadcaster Reverend Richard Coles, former Shadow Chancellor Ed Balls, and children's author and poet Michael Rosen. This festival also included an episode of BBC Radio 3's New Generation Thinkers as parts of the festival's launch night.

=== 2018 – Imagining the Impossible ===
The 2018 York Festival of Ideas took place from 5 to 17 June under the overarching banner of Imagining the Impossible.

The festival hosted one of the BBC's annual Reith Lectures for BBC Radio 4 with historian Margaret MacMillan on the subject of gender and warfare.

The festival focus days revolved around the topics of The Future of UK Higher Education, Achieving Peace in the Middle East and A Date with History: Imagining Revolutions, as well as there being a Harry Potter-inspired Witchcraft and Wizardry day of events for families.

=== 2019 – A World of Wonder ===
The 2019 York Festival of Ideas took place from 4 to 16 June under the banner of A World of Wonder.

Speakers included the film director Mike Leigh speaking about his film, Peterloo, Debbie Horsfield, the BAFTA award winning writer of the BBC’s Poldark, and journalist Gavin Esler. Festival focus topics included What have universities ever done for us? and Artificial Intelligence: Looking to the future.

=== 2020 – Virtual Horizons ===
York Festival of Ideas for 2020 was due to be held as normal from 2–14 June 2020. As a result of the COVID-19 pandemic in the United Kingdom, the festival was relaunched as the York Festival of Ideas 2020 online running instead under the banner of Virtual Horizons. Despite the solely online format, the festival was still able to offer a wide variety of events ranging from concerts to poetry workshops to puzzles in the (virtual) pub. Headline speakers at the Festival include journalist Emily Maitlis, the presenter of BBC Two's flagship Newsnight programme; physicist, author and broadcaster, Jim Al-Khalili; Philip Alston, former United Nations Special Rapporteur on extreme poverty; Guardian columnist Polly Toynbee; behavioural scientist Dr Pragya Agarwal; V&A Museum’s Keeper of the Asian Department, Anna Jackson; and LBC radio presenter and broadcaster Iain Dale.

=== 2021 – Infinite Horizons ===
Due to the ongoing Covid-19 restrictions in place in the UK, the 2021 festival (8–20 June) took place predominantly online for the second year in a row, this time under the banner of Infinite Horizons. The international launch event, filmed in York Minster and entitled She-Energy: Women as creators featured an array of international musicians, writers and poets and a specially commissioned performance by acclaimed violinist and composer Anna Phoebe. Other speakers included the writer and historian William Dalrymple, public historian and broadcaster Greg Jenner and activist and former politician Magid Magid.

=== 2022 – The Next Chapter ===
The 2022 festival took place between 11 and 24 June under the theme of "...The Next Chapter". Following two years of online festivals due to the Covid-19 pandemic, this year's took a hybrid approach, continuing the online provision for audiences whilst also reintroducing in-person events around the city of York. As such, the festival was able to attract a worldwide audience of over 40,000 over the course of nearly 200 events. Festival Director Joan Concannon stated that "looking back a few years from now, this year’s hybrid format will be viewed as a milestone in the history of the Festival" as it established a balanced provision that reaffirmed the festival's commitment to remaining as accessible as possible. The 2022 festival attracted Oscar-winning film editor and University of York alumnus, Joe Walker, crime writer Ann Cleeves and actress Dame Harriet Walter among others.

=== 2023 – Rediscover, Reimagine, Rebuild ===
The 2023 festival ran from the 2 to the 15 June. Following the success of the 2022 festival's hybrid approach, this year's continued to run a combination of online and in-person events, inviting audiences to "Rediscover, Reimagine, Rebuild". Michael Morpurgo returned to the festival to celebrate the 40th anniversary of his beloved book War Horse with an abridged reading of this tale accompanied by music and songs from the famous National Theatre production. Other speakers included the BBC presenter and Team GB triathlete Louise Minchin, former Chief Prosecutor Nazir Afzal and bestselling author, historian and broadcaster Tracy Borman.

=== 2024 – The Power Of… ===
The 2024 Festival took place in person and online from 1–14 June under the banner of ‘The Power Of…’ The Festival inspired a local and global audience of over 58,000 with a diverse programme of talks, exhibitions, performances, guided walks and interactive activities. Inspirational speakers and performers included children’s author Michael Morpurgo; double-Olympic champion Dame Kelly Holmes; BBC Security Correspondent Frank Gardner; broadcaster Janina Ramirez; journalists Gavin Esler and Zeinab Badawi; Ambassadors Steven Pifer and Androulla Kaminara; and violinist and composer Anna Phoebe - among many others. The annual festival also included a range of focus sessions which examined topical issues ranging from wealth and poverty, to the security of elections, and the challenges of preserving our heritage, to the power of good business.

=== 2025 – Making Waves ===
York Festival of Ideas presented over 260 events in person and online from 31 May to 13 June 2025, attracting a local, national and international audience of over 54,000. Delivered under the banner of Making Waves, the mostly free programme included talks, workshops, performances, guided walks and family-friendly activities. Inspirational speakers and performers included children’s author and Festival Patron Michael Morpurgo; historians Tracy Borman and William Dalrymple; journalists Ros Atkins and Isabel Berwick; biologist Kathy Willis; Carnatic singer Supriya Nagarajan; and Countryfile presenter Tom Heap. Festival Focus sessions examined a range of challenging issues including the security of Europe, AI and the Future of Work, the creation of a more equal society and next generation rail transport.
