= John Beazley =

British art historian and archaeologist (1885–1970)

Professor Sir John Beazley CH FBA
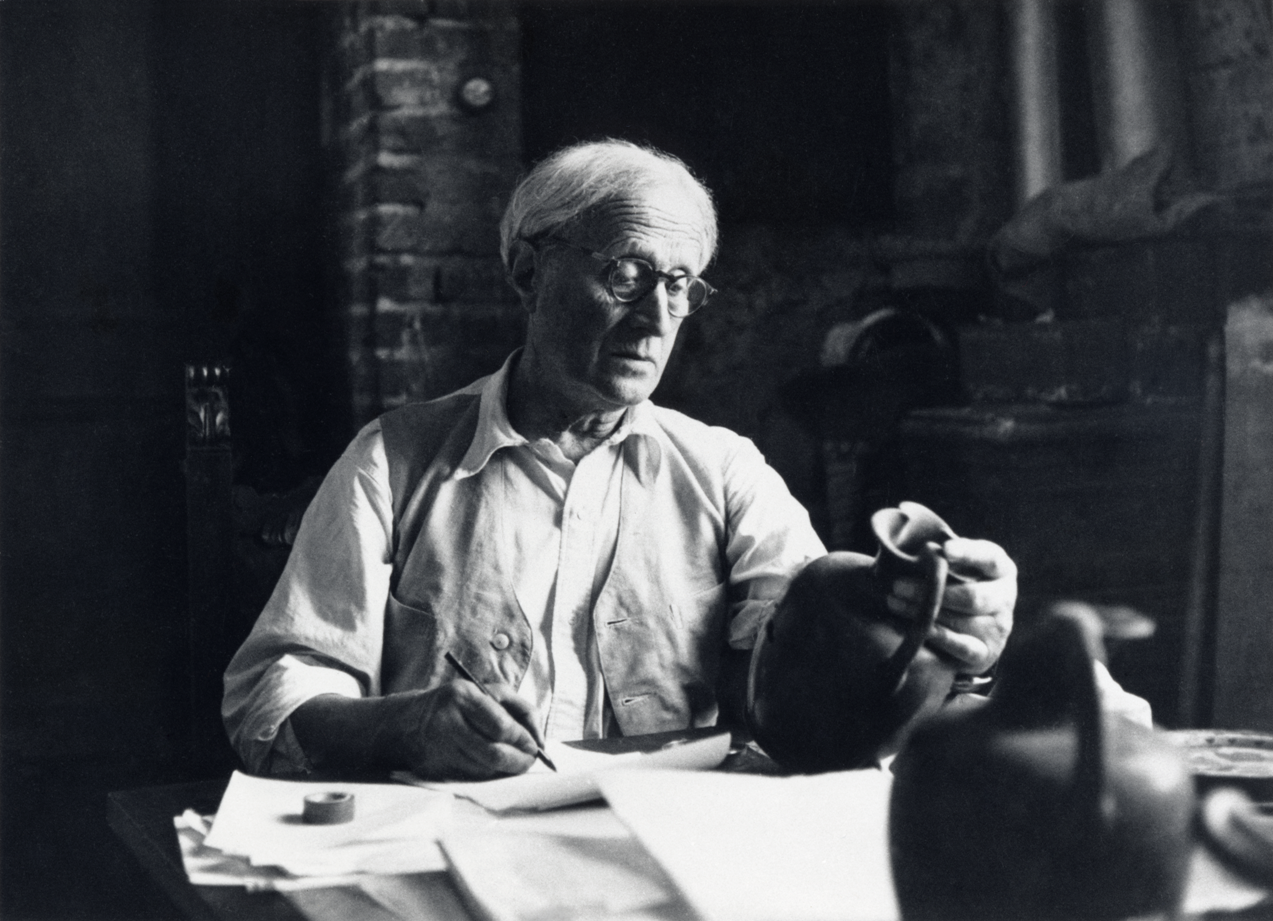
- Beazley cataloguing an unidentified vase in 1956
- Born: John Davidson Beazley; 13 September 1885; Glasgow, Scotland
- Died: 6 May 1970 (aged 84); Oxford, England
- Title: Lincoln Professor of Classical Archaeology and Art
- Board member of: British Academy
- Spouse: Marie Ezra (m. 1919; died 1967)
- Awards: Order of the Companions of Honour

Academic background
- Education: Balliol College, Oxford (BA)

Academic work
- Discipline: Archaeology and classics
- Sub-discipline: Classical archaeology; art history; Ancient Greek pottery
- Institutions: British School at Athens; Christ Church, Oxford; Faculty of Classics, University of Oxford
- Notable works: Attic Red-Figure Vase-Painters (1946); Attic Black-Figure Vase-Painters (1956)

Sir John Davidson Beazley (/ˈbiːzli/; 13 September 1885 – 6 May 1970) was a British classical archaeologist and art historian, known for his classification of Attic vases by artistic style. He was professor of classical archaeology and art at the University of Oxford from 1925 to 1956.

== Early life ==
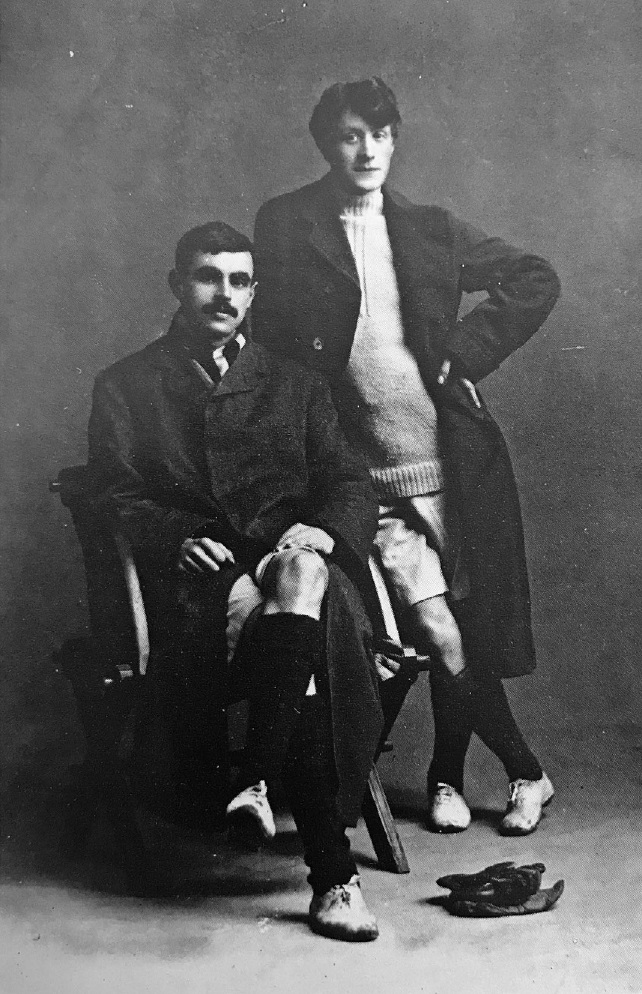
James Elroy Flecker (sitting) and Beazley (standing) in 1908.

Beazley was born in Glasgow, Scotland on 13 September 1885, to Mark John Murray Beazley (died 1940) and Mary Catherine Beazley née Davidson (died 1918). He was educated at King Edward VI School, Southampton and Christ's Hospital, Sussex. He then attended Balliol College, Oxford where he read Literae Humaniores: he received firsts in both Mods and Greats. He won the Gaisford Prize in Greek composition for "Herodotus at the Zoo", a parody of Herodotus in which the historian visits London Zoo. He graduated with a Bachelor of Arts (BA) degree in 1907.

While at Oxford, Beazley became a close friend of the poet James Elroy Flecker. They were perhaps lovers, as A. L. Rowse suggested in an article for The Spectator; certainly their relationship took place within what one biographer has described as "an aura of bisexuality". The pair founded the "Praxiteles Club" together, a club of which they were the only members. The only rule was that members were to wear a particular blazer, white with gold trimmings. Among Beazley's other friends during this time were John Maynard Keynes, Lytton Strachey, and Rupert Brooke.

Beazley was a keen poet in his youth but abandoned it (and ceased even to speak of it) as his scholarly pursuits begun to take up all his time. Flecker addressed a poem to Beazley, an "invitation to a young but learned friend to abandon archaeology for the moment, and play once more with his neglected Muse". T. E. Lawrence once commented of Beazley that "if it hadn't been for that accursed Greek art, he'd have been a very fine poet". Beazley and Flecker drifted apart as Beazley drifted away from poetry.

== Academic career ==
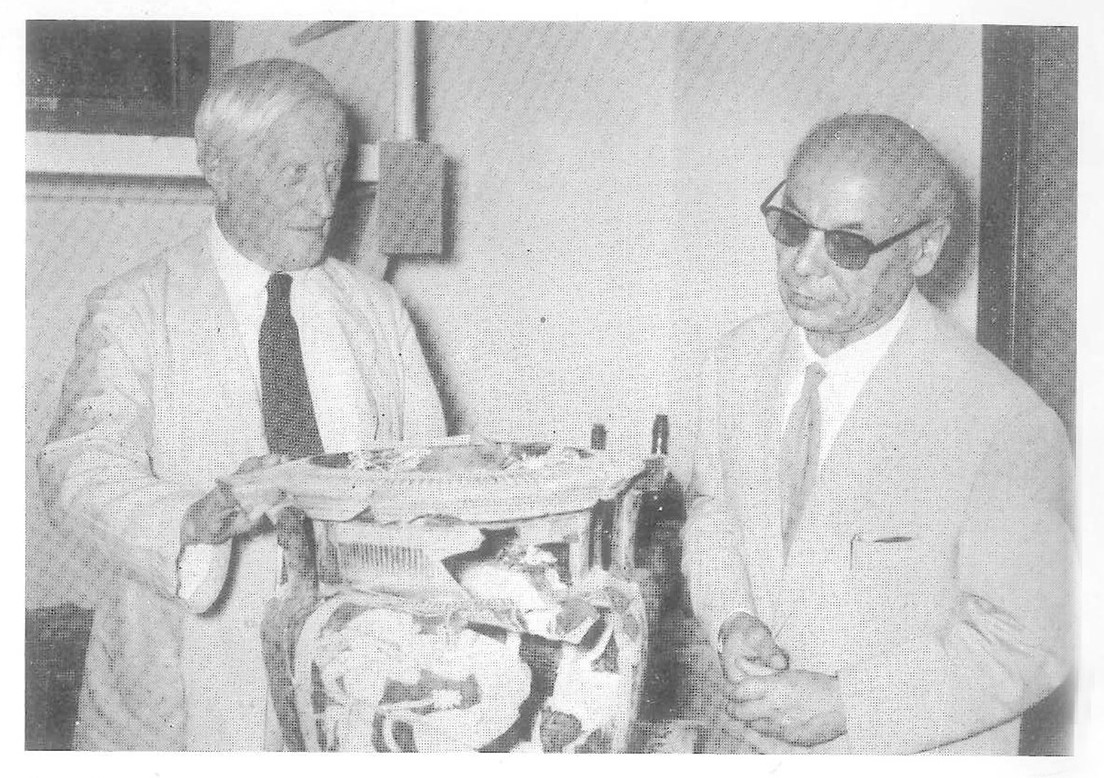
Beazley (left) with Gino Pelizzola looking at a Greek vase mid-restoration in 1967

After graduating, Beazley spent time at the British School at Athens. He then returned to the University of Oxford as a student (equivalent to fellow) and tutor in Classics at Christ Church.

During World War I, Beazley served in military intelligence. For most of the war he worked in Room 40 (Cryptanalysis) of the Admiralty's Naval Intelligence Division, where his colleagues included his fellow-archaeologist Winifred Lamb. He held the temporary rank of second lieutenant from March to October 1916 when he was on secondment to the British Army.

In 1925, he became Lincoln Professor of Classical Archaeology and Art at the University of Oxford, a position he held until 1956. He specialised in Greek decorated pottery (particularly black-figure and red-figure), and became a world authority on the subject. He adapted the art-historical method initiated by Giovanni Morelli to attribute the specific "hands" (style) of specific workshops and artists, even where no signed piece offered a name, e.g. the Berlin Painter, whose production he first distinguished. He looked at the sweep of classical pottery—major and minor pieces—to construct a history of workshops and artists in ancient Athens. The first English edition of his book, Attic Red-figure Vase-painters, appeared in 1942 (in German as Attische Vasenmaler des rotfigurigen Stils, 1925).

== Later life ==
Beazley retired in 1956, but continued to work until his death in Oxford, on 6 May 1970. His personal archive was purchased by the University of Oxford in 1964. It was originally accommodated in the Ashmolean Museum, but in 2007 it moved into the Ioannou Centre for Classical and Byzantine Studies as part of the new Classical Art Research Centre.

== Honours ==
Beazley was elected as a Fellow of the British Academy (FBA) in 1927. He was elected to the American Philosophical Society in 1943. In 1954, he was elected a Foreign Honorary Member of the American Academy of Arts and Sciences.

Beazley was appointed a Knight Bachelor in 1949, and therefore granted the title Sir. He was appointed to the Order of the Companions of Honour in the 1959 New Year Honours "for services to scholarship".

== Personal life ==
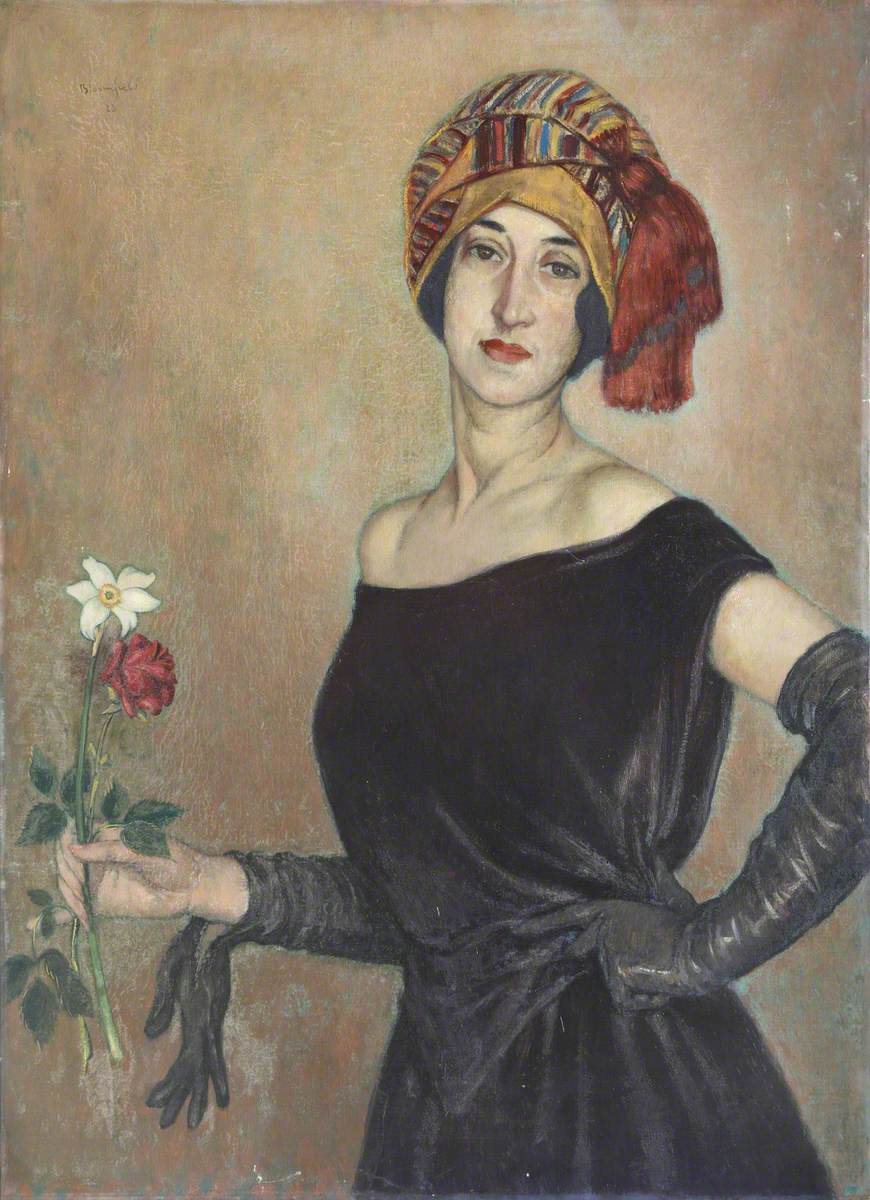
Marie Beazley, painted by Harry Bloomfield in 1923.

In 1919, Beazley married a widow, Marie Ezra (née Bloomfield), whose first husband had been killed in World War I. In their early years together, the pair kept a goose in Christ Church, which Marie would take out for exercise in Tom Quad. Marie helped Beazley's work by photographing vases for him. Beazley had no children with Marie, but had a stepdaughter from Marie's first marriage, Giovanna Marie Therese Babette "Mary" Ezra. Mary Ezra married Irish poet Louis MacNeice. Marie died in 1967.

The classical scholar Martin Robertson described Beazley as follows:

He had great charm, and could be an amusing and delightful companion; but as he grew older his total deafness and his increasing absorption in his work combined to cut him off to some degree from other people. He was modest, and took immense trouble with the guidance of his pupils, treating them as equals and winning their devoted affection. He was completely generous in communicating his knowledge, not only to these but to all who consulted him, as in increasing numbers scholars, collectors, and dealers constantly did. In appearance he was somewhat under medium height, slight but well made, with striking blue eyes and fair hair (white in age), and fine rather ascetic features which suggested to many a fifteenth-century Flemish portrait, a Van Eyck or a Van der Weyden. He was never professionally painted, but his wife, a talented untaught artist, drew several heads of him in coloured chalks which are preserved in Oxford, at Balliol, Christ Church, and Lincoln.

== Archive ==
There is a notebook in Beazley's hand in Bodleian Archives & Manuscripts, the Bodleian Library, Oxford (MS. Eng. misc. e. 1390), containing his notes on Greek literature and sculpture and on Roman history, and also his illustrations of classical statuary and his sketched caricatures of some contemporaries.
