= Runciman Award =

Annual literary award

The Runciman Award is an annual literary award offered by the Anglo-Hellenic League for a work published in English dealing wholly or in part with Greece or Hellenism. On some years the prize has been awarded jointly and shared between two or more authors. The award is named in honour of the late Sir Steven Runciman and is currently sponsored (since 2021) by the A. G. Leventis Foundation and the Athanasios C. Laskaridis Charitable Foundation. The value of the prize is £10,000.

== Recipients ==
=== UK prizes ===
Prizes awarded for books published in the United Kingdom in the previous year:

Year	Name	Work	Editor
1986	David Constantine	Travellers in Greece	Cambridge University Press
1987	No award	-	-
1988	John S. Koliopoulos	Brigands with a Cause:Brigandage and Irredentism in Modern Greece, 1820-1921	Oxford University Press
1989	Rowland J. Mainstone	Hagia Sophia: Architecture, Structure and Liturgy of Justinian’s Great Church	Thames and Hudson
1990	John Gould	Herodotus	Weidenfeld & Nicolson
1991	Sir Hugh Lloyd-Jones	The Academic Papers	Oxford University Press
1992	Mark Mazower	Greece and the Inter-War Economic Crisis	Oxford University Press
1992	Antony Beevor	Crete: the Battle and the Resistance	John Murray
1993	Richard Clogg	A Concise History of Greece	Cambridge University Press
1994	Paul Magdalino	The Empire of Manuel I Komnenos, 1143-1180	Cambridge University Press
1995	Roderick Beaton	An Introduction to Modern Greek Literature	Oxford University Press
1996	Sir John Boardman	The Diffusion of Classical Art in Antiquity	Thames and Hudson
1996	Dr Rosemary Morris	Monks and Laymen in Byzantium, 843-1118	Cambridge University Press
1997	Andrew Dalby	Siren Feasts: A History of Food and Gastronomy in Greece	Routledge
1997	Oliver Rackham & Jennifer Moody	The Making of the Cretan Landscape	Manchester University Press
1997	Gelina Harlaftis	A History of Greek-owned Shipping: the Making of an International Tramp Fleet, 1830 to the present day	Routledge
1997	Nigel Spivey	Understanding Greek Sculpture:Ancient Meanings, Modern Readings	Thames and Hudson
1998	George Cawkwell	Thucydides and the Peloponnesian War	Routledge
1998	Dr Martin West	The East Face of Helicon: West Asiatic Elements in Greek Poetry and Myth	Clarendon Press, Oxford
1998	Prof. Robin Cormack	Painting and the Soul: Icons, Death Masks and Shrouds	Reaktion Books
1998	Patricia Storace	Dinner with Persephone	Granta Books
1999	Ian MacNiven	Lawrence Durrell: a Biography	Faber & Faber
1999	Christopher Stray	Classics Transformed: Schools, Universities and Society in England, 1830-1960	Clarendon Press, Oxford
1999	Dr Jenny March	Dictionary of Classical Mythology	Cassell
2000	Prof. J. V. Luce	Celebrating Homer’s Landscapes	Yale University Press
2000	Dr Reviel Netz	The Shaping of Deduction in Greek Mathematics: A Study in Cognitive History	Cambridge University Press
2001	Dr Cyprian Broodbank	An Island Archaeology of the Early Cyclades	Cambridge University Press
2002	James Whitley	The Archaeology of Ancient Greece	Cambridge University Press
2003	Sir John Boardman	The Archaeology of Nostalgia:How the Greeks re-created their Mythical Past	Thames and Hudson

=== UK and Worldwide Prizes ===
From 2004, prizes have been awarded for books published in English anywhere in the world in the previous year:

Year	Name	Work	Editor
2004	Roderick Beaton	George Seferis – Waiting for the Angel – A Biography	Yale University Press
2005	Mark Mazower	Salonica, City of Ghosts: Christians, Muslims and Jews	Harper Collins
2006	Robin Lane Fox	The Classical World	Time Warner Book Group
2006	Tom Holland	Persian Fire	Allen Lane
2007	Bruce Clark	Twice a Stranger	Granta Books
2007	Robert Holland & Diana Markides	The British and the Hellenes	Oxford University Press
2008	Imogen Grundon	The Rash Adventurer: A Life of John Pendlebury	Libri Publications
2009	K.E. Fleming	Greece - A Jewish History	Princeton University Press
2010	Juliet du Boulay	Cosmos, Life and Liturgy in a Greek Orthodox Village	Denise Harvey Publishers
2011	Molly Greene	Catholic Pirates and Greek Merchants: A Maritime History of the Early Modern Mediterranean	Princeton University Press
2011	Emily Greenwood	Afro-Greeks: Dialogues Between Anglophone Caribbean Literature and Classics in the 20th Century	Oxford University Press
2012	Peter Thonemann	The Maeander Valley	Cambridge University Press
2013	Simon Goldhill	Sophocles and the Language of Tragedy	Oxford University Press
2014	Roderick Beaton	Byron’s War: Romantic Rebellion, Greek Revolution	Cambridge University Press
2015	Armand M. Leroi	The Lagoon: How Aristotle Invented Science	Bloomsbury Publishing
2016	Sharon E. J. Gerstel	Rural Lives and Landscapes in Late Byzantium	Cambridge University Press
2017a (jointly)	Ivan Drpić	Epigram, Art and Devotion in Later Byzantium	Cambridge University Press
2017b (jointly)	Marc Domingo Gygax	Benefaction and Rewards in the Ancient Greek City	Cambridge University Press
2018a (jointly)	Matthew Simonton	Classical Greek Oligarchy	Princeton University Press
2018b (jointly)	Colm Tóibín	House of Names	Penguin/Viking
2019a (jointly)	Paul J. Kosmin	Time and its Adversaries in the Seleucid Empire	Belknap Press of Harvard
2019b (jointly)	Robin Osborne	The Transformation of Athens: Painted Pottery and the Creation of Classical Greece	Princeton University Press
2020/21	Roderick Beaton	Greece: Biography of a Modern Nation	Allen Lane
2022	Ian Collins	John Craxton: A Life of Gifts	Yale University Press
2023	A. E. Stallings	This Afterlife: Selected Poems	Carcanet
2024	Islam Issa	Alexandria: The City that Changed the World	Sceptre
2025	Sasha Dugdale	The Strongbox	Carcanet
2026	Julian Hoffman	Lifelines: Searching for Home in the Mountains of Greece	Elliott and Thompson
