= Islam: The Untold Story =

2012 British documentary film by Kevin Sim and Tom Holland

- Title credits
- Created by: Kevin Sim (producer, director)
- Written by: Tom Holland
- Directed by: Kevin Sim
- Starring: Tom Holland
- Original language: English

Production
- Running time: 74 minutes
- Production company: Channel 4

Original release
- Network: Channel 4
- Release: 28 August 2012

Islam: The Untold Story is a documentary film written and directed by Kevin Sim and presented by the English novelist and popular historian Tom Holland. The documentary explores the origins of Islam, an Abrahamic religion that developed in Arabia in the 7th century and criticises the orthodox Islamic account of this history, claiming that the traditional story lacks sufficient supporting evidence. It was commissioned by the British television company Channel 4 and first broadcast in August 2012. Its release followed the publication of Holland's In the Shadow of the Sword: The Battle for Global Empire and the End of the Ancient World (2012), which also discussed the rise of the Arab Empire and the origins of Islam.

Adopting the theories of the academic historian Patricia Crone as a basis, Holland claimed there was little hard evidence for the origins of Islam and asked why it took several decades after the death of Muhammad for his name to appear on surviving documents or artifacts. Arguing that there was little evidence for how the faith was born, he suggested that the city of Mecca may not have been the real birthplace of Muhammad and Islam. While not disputing Muhammad's existence as a real historical figure, he posited that much of the Islamic origin myth was developed later, in the early years of the Arab Empire.

The documentary proved controversial. Mainstream media reception was mixed, but it provoked criticism from figures within the United Kingdom's Islamic community who argued that Holland ignored evidence supporting the orthodox account of early Islamic history. Government-approved regulatory authority Ofcom and the broadcaster Channel 4 received an estimated 1200 complaints regarding the programme. Fearing violent retaliation from militant Muslims, Channel 4 cancelled a public screening of the documentary at their London headquarters.

== Background ==
I think being a religious believer requires you to take a leap of faith, and I think there's a degree to which Muslims, far more than Christians, have felt that the foundation myths of their religion are somehow historical fact, and it seems to me that they're clearly not. There must be a bedrock of fact, but it is more sacred history than it is history, and your ability to believe in sacred history must ultimately come down to faith, so I suspect that Muslims who read the book will maybe have their faith tested, but I'm sure will emerge triumphant from the test.

— Tom Holland in The Spectator.

Holland is an English novelist and popular historian who had published a trio of best-selling histories of the ancient world: Rubicon: The Last Years of the Roman Republic (2003), Persian Fire: The First World Empire and the Battle for the West (2005), and Millennium: The End of the World and the Forging of Christendom (2008). In 2012, Holland's fourth work of history, In the Shadow of the Sword: The Battle for Global Empire and the End of the Ancient World, was published; it explored the collapse of the Roman and Persian Empires, as well as the rise of the Arab Empire and the accompanying Arabian religion of Islam.

In an interview with The Spectator, Holland rejected the Islamic belief that the Qur'an constituted the direct word of God, stating that he believed it to have been "very clearly" written by a human being during Late Antiquity. He highlighted "the lack of sources" that were available with which to analyse the origins of Islam, and that all religious movements come to construct their own back story, in doing so erasing alternative accounts and interpretations of their history.

It was on the basis of In the Shadow of the Sword that Channel 4, a commercial television company based in the U.K., commissioned Holland to produce a documentary on the subject of Islam's origins. A spokesperson for the company publicly announced that the documentary constituted a part of their "remit to support and stimulate well-informed debate on a wide range of issues" through "challenging established views" and providing access to alternative perspectives and information.

== Synopsis ==
Islam: The Untold Story deals with the origins of the religion Islam. Travelling to Saudi Arabia, Holland visits Arabian Bedouins to hear their orthodox Islamic accounts of the religion's origins. Holland then talks to Seyyed Hossein Nasr, a practising Muslim who teaches Islamic studies at the George Washington University, Washington D.C., and Patricia Crone, a non-Muslim historian of Islamic history at the Institute for Advanced Study, Princeton. The former defends the orthodox Islamic account of the faith's history, citing its development within oral history, but Crone challenges the reliability of oral history, and therefore the traditional account.

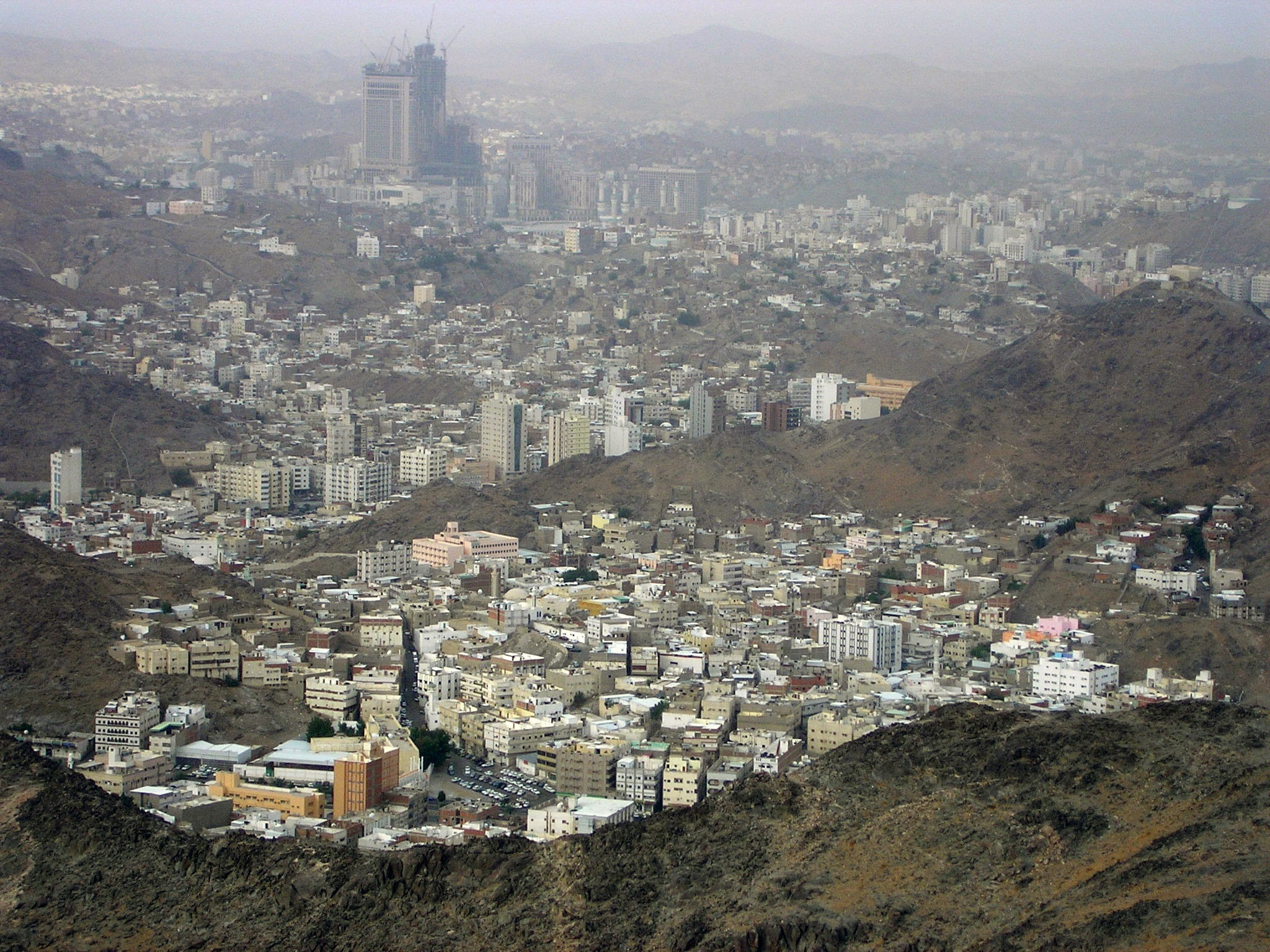
Holland suggested that Mecca (pictured) was not the home of Muhammad

Holland looks at the earliest evidence for Muhammad, Mecca and Islam in the first century of the Arab Empire, pointing to a lack of evidence in the historical record to support the traditional account. He points out that there is almost no contemporary historical evidence about the life of Muhammad, with no mention of him at all in historical texts until 70 years after his death. He states that contrary to Islamic doctrine which says Islam was behind the creation of the Arab Empire, Muawiyah I became leader of the Arab Empire in Jerusalem 30 years after Muhammad's death despite showing little sign of being Muslim, and that no mention of Muhammad or Islam can be found in any of Muawiyah's inscriptions, coins, or documents.

Holland proceeds to note that with the exception of a single ambiguous reference in the Qur'an, there is no mention of Mecca in any datable text until a century after Muhammad's death. He points out that in the Qur'an, the Prophet appears to address farmers and agriculturalists while his opponents are described as keeping cattle and growing olives and vines. This appears to describe an environment foreign to Mecca, where there was no agriculture; thus Holland posits that the location attributed to Mecca in the Qur'an more closely fits a city in the Negev desert, in what is now southern Israel.

Holland suggests that under the reign of Arab Emperor Abd al-Malik ibn Marwan, Mecca was intentionally yet erroneously portrayed as Muhammad's home and the birthplace of Islam in order to provide the religion with Arabian origins. Holland argues that in doing so, the faith was dissociated from the Jewish or Christian heritage that would have been self evident at a location in the Negev.

== Cancelled public screening ==
After security fears were raised, on 11 September 2012, Channel 4 cancelled a planned screening of the film for "opinion formers" at its London headquarters. They said they were nevertheless "extremely proud" of the film and would continue to provide access to it on their website, 4oD.

Their decision to cancel was criticised by Jenny Taylor, the founder of Lapido Media, a consultancy specialising in religious literacy in world affairs. Invited to attend the event, Taylor described the documentary as a good historical study and its cancellation as the "appalling" result of protest whipped up by the media. She argued that the right to debate historical events was a core value of the western world, and that Islam should not be exempt from historical inquiry. The Council of Ex-Muslims of Britain expressed indignation at the cancellation, stating that giving in to the demands of Islamists would have a "catastrophic" effect on "free enquiry and expression where it pertains to Islam". They urged supporters to write to Channel 4 and Ofcom requesting a repeat screening.

== Reception ==
=== Media reviews ===
In The Independent, television reviewer Tom Sutcliffe noted that the documentary was likely to court controversy and cause problems for Holland. Although remarking that he did not know what devout Muslims would think of Holland's arguments, he asserted that "As a historian, Holland was troubled by a gap in the record, and by inconsistencies between the scriptural account and hard evidence on the ground. But the absence of evidence only matters to those for whom evidence is a sort of god. Those who have a God already, capitalised and unquestionable, don't really care either way...For those of us who don't take the Koran as the word of God the evidence was rather interesting, if by necessity inconclusive." Sutcliffe maintained that Holland had made his arguments "tactfully".

Writing in The Daily Telegraph, Christopher Howse, a commentator on religious issues, was critical of the documentary, awarding it two stars out of five and labelling it "disjointed". He argued that it placed too much emphasis on historiography but that its "crowning annoyance" was Holland's habit of pausing mid-sentence. In contrast, Ed West, also of The Daily Telegraph, praised the documentary, stating that it was "atmospheric and intelligent". Noting it would make many viewers uncomfortable, he argued that the Islamic world had to accept "higher criticism" and "embrace the pain of doubt" in order to improve life for themselves and for their non-Muslim neighbours.

In an article on the political news and commentary website The Commentator, author and journalist Philippe Labrecque characterized the documentary as "harmless" and criticized what he saw as Channel 4's lack of courage in canceling the public screening: "What is threatened by our lack of courage in facing violent fundamentalists...is the very nature of Western empiricism and skepticism; in other words, the foundations of science."

In his review for The Guardian, the journalist John Crace complained that Holland had tried too hard to avoid offending Muslims, writing "For decades – centuries even – scholars have felt free to contest the accuracy of other religious texts. Not least the Bible; what's true, what's parable and what's just wishful thinking has all been up for grabs without any serious damage being done to Christian beliefs. Not so with Islam, around which non-Islamic scholars tread with extreme caution. I'm all for cultural and religious sensitivity, but the degree to which Holland tiptoed around the subject and apologised for his findings went way beyond what was required. Or would have been on offer for any other religion."

In the Arab Review, Raphael Cormack—a doctoral candidate in Middle Eastern studies—characterised the documentary as "an honest attempt to conduct historical research on a very murky period, and one that should be praised". He also lamented what he saw as the frequent attention given by Western scholars to Islam's origin story, with far less coverage being given to the rest of Islam's 1,300-year history.

=== Muslim responses ===
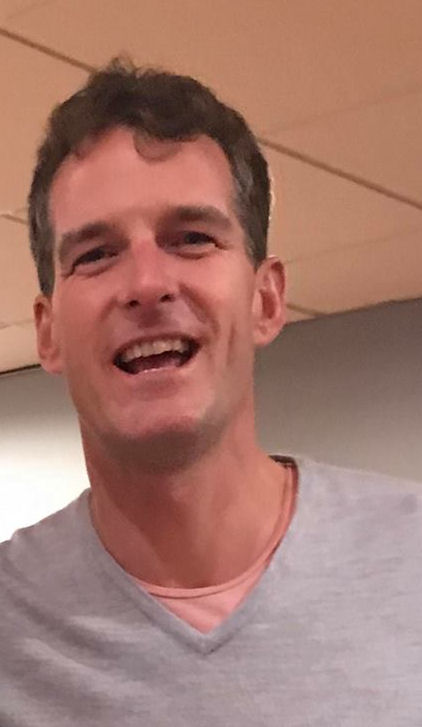
On Twitter, the popular historian Dan Snow defended Holland against those threatening him

According to Cormack, Muslim responses on social media were largely negative, with some people attacking Holland on Twitter and some making personal threats against him. One commented that "You might be a target in the streets. You may recruit some bodyguards, for your own safety." Another stated that Holland was a "fool" for suggesting Islam was a "made-up religion". The historian Dan Snow responded to these attacks by tweeting: "Dear angry mad people on twitter, it is conceivable that you know more than @holland_tom & the world's leading scholars, but very unlikely".

The Huffington Post published a response from practising Muslim Afroze Zaidi-Jivraj, a graduate in English who had recently begun a master's degree in theology at the University of Birmingham. She asserted that Holland's methodology was flawed because he had neglected to study the corpus of material on early Islamic history found in libraries across the Islamic world, instead using only sources he had obtained in Western libraries. Zaidi-Jivraj argued that he did not consult any Islamic scholars of Islamic history, instead choosing the more "exotic" option of interviewing a Bedouin, and that although he had consulted Professor Seyyed Hossein Nasr – who she called "a token Muslim voice" – Nasr was a scholar of Islamic philosophy, and not Islamic history. She expressed a fear that the programme would promote negative views of "an already poorly-understood faith and its much-maligned adherents."

Pakistani Muslim Irfan Husain, who writes a weekly column for the Dawn newspaper, defended Holland and the documentary in a column titled "Blasphemy in the Digital Age". Husain maintained that by making threats and calling for programmes that offended them to be banned from the air, Muslims would only "confirm the widespread impression in the West of Muslims as volatile, irrational people." He continued: "This is meant to be a scholarly, serious examination of the earliest period of Islam by Tom Holland, a respected historian who recently wrote Under the Shadow of the Sword about the same subject. Holland's purpose in the series is to question assumptions and beliefs about a virtually undocumented period of early Islam...Clearly, we need to draw a clear distinction between gratuitous attempts to shock and offend and historical research."

Abdullah al Andalusi of the Muslim Debate Initiative summed up Islam: the Untold Story as "a missed opportunity to transcend an outdated Besserwissen approach to comparative religion, and to establish an inter-faith dialogue based on insightful mutual understanding and acceptance of who we are today. While informed revisionist readings of the history of all faiths, Islam included, is to be encouraged, Tom Holland's TV show, an anti-Islamic polemic dressed up as history, does not do what it says on the tin. In reality it's just more post-9/11 telly fodder, a continuation of the Clash of Civilizations by other means".

State media in Iran criticized the documentary, claiming that it constituted an "insult" to Islam.

Tehmina Kazi of the group British Muslims for Secular Democracy, was critical of the documentary but also felt that Muslims were too quick to become defensive and negative at any examination of their faith, saying "I remember a few years back there was a BBC documentary exposing some of the things that were happening inside madrassas (Islamic schools) and one group was putting out press releases calling on viewers to complain before it had even been broadcast. The default response was complain, complain, complain." She advised offended Muslims to "respond, don't react".

Inayat Bunglawala, chair of Muslims4UK, said "I have no time for those who say Channel 4 shouldn't broadcast such a programme. Every broadcaster and historian has the right to examine the historical origins of any faith. But our objections were more about the quality of the documentary itself and the arguments Tom made."

The UK-based Islamic Education & Research Academy (iERA) proclaimed that the documentary was "historically inaccurate" and "clearly biased". In their statement, iERA proclaimed that "Holland should have spent a little more time with Islamic historians instead of wasting all those precious minutes in learning the way of the Bedouin." Similarly, the Muslim Public Affairs Committee (MPACUK) stated that the documentary had a "flagrant bias" against Islam, expressing concern that the majority of viewers would "blindly accept" Holland's conclusions.

=== Other responses ===
Theologian Keith Small of the International Qur'anic Studies Association accused the documentary's critics of engaging in "theological mugging" and wrote "'Why must honest questions about the origins of Islam be met with such hostility? Tom Holland asks his questions with sincerity, sympathy, and intellectual integrity. Isn't the legitimate academic study of history driven by this kind of honest questioning?"

Sociologist Jenny Taylor, founder of the Lapido Media Centre for Religious Literacy in World Affairs, defended Holland from the IERA criticism, saying "The IERA turns out to be the platform of the controversial convert Sheikh Abduraheem Green, a mixed up cross-culture kid if ever there was one: a public-schoolboy convert to Islam, currently with two wives, and at different times, an advocate of holy war, and hell for Mother Teresa." Taylor went on to praise the documentary: "[Holland]'s shown all of us that Islam is interesting enough to be taken seriously. He's refused to stick his head in the sand and play blind about the problems or internal tensions that all thinking Muslims know are there."

In 2017, journalist and commentator Douglas Murray wrote in The Spectator that the criticism Holland had received for this documentary had deterred other scholarly historical programming on Islam in the years since: "Five years ago...Holland presented a documentary for Channel 4 titled Islam: The Untold Story that was something of a landmark in UK television...here was a grown-up and scholarly treatment which looked at the issue as though there weren't blasphemy police around every corner. Sadly, part of the reception of that programme, and numerous events in the years since, have kept such displays of scholarly truthfulness nearly as much of a rarity since as they were before."

=== Holland's response to criticism ===
Writing on the Channel 4 website, Holland responded to the criticism by claiming that the origins of Islam is a "legitimate subject of historical enquiry" and that his documentary was "a historical endeavour and is not a critique of one of the major monotheistic religions". Comparing his documentary with others that Channel 4 had produced on religious history, such as The Bible: A History, he noted that Islam: The Untold Story fell within the channel's remit of sparking "well-informed debate on a wide range of issues".

In 2015, Holland gave an interview to Open magazine in which he addressed the controversy over Islam: The Untold Story: "In Islam, there isn't really anything within the Qur'an that would encourage Muslims to ask, 'Might this not be from God?' Therefore, when people study the Qur'an as though it were just another text, it can seem to many Muslims very insulting and upsetting." He stood by his conclusions in the film, saying "It seems to me that when you look at the emergence of Islam, the fact that we have no commentaries on the Qur'an, no compilations of Hadiths, we have no biographies of Muhammad, we have no histories of the early Arab conquests, till about two centuries after the lifetime of Muhammad; [this] renders it very problematic to assume that what we have in the biographies and histories are historically accurate."
