= Millennium (Holland book) =

2008 book by Tom Holland

Millennium: The End of the World and the Forging of Christendom
- The first edition cover.
- Author: Tom Holland
- Language: English
- Publisher: Little, Brown Book Group
- Publication date: 2008
- Publication place: United Kingdom
- Media type: Hardcover
- ISBN: 978-0316732451
- Preceded by: Persian Fire
- Followed by: In the Shadow of the Sword

Millennium: The End of the World and the Forging of Christendom is a historical study of the Middle Ages by the popular historian Tom Holland. It was first published in 2008 by the Little, Brown Book Group.
