= Emily Greenwood =

Professor of Classics

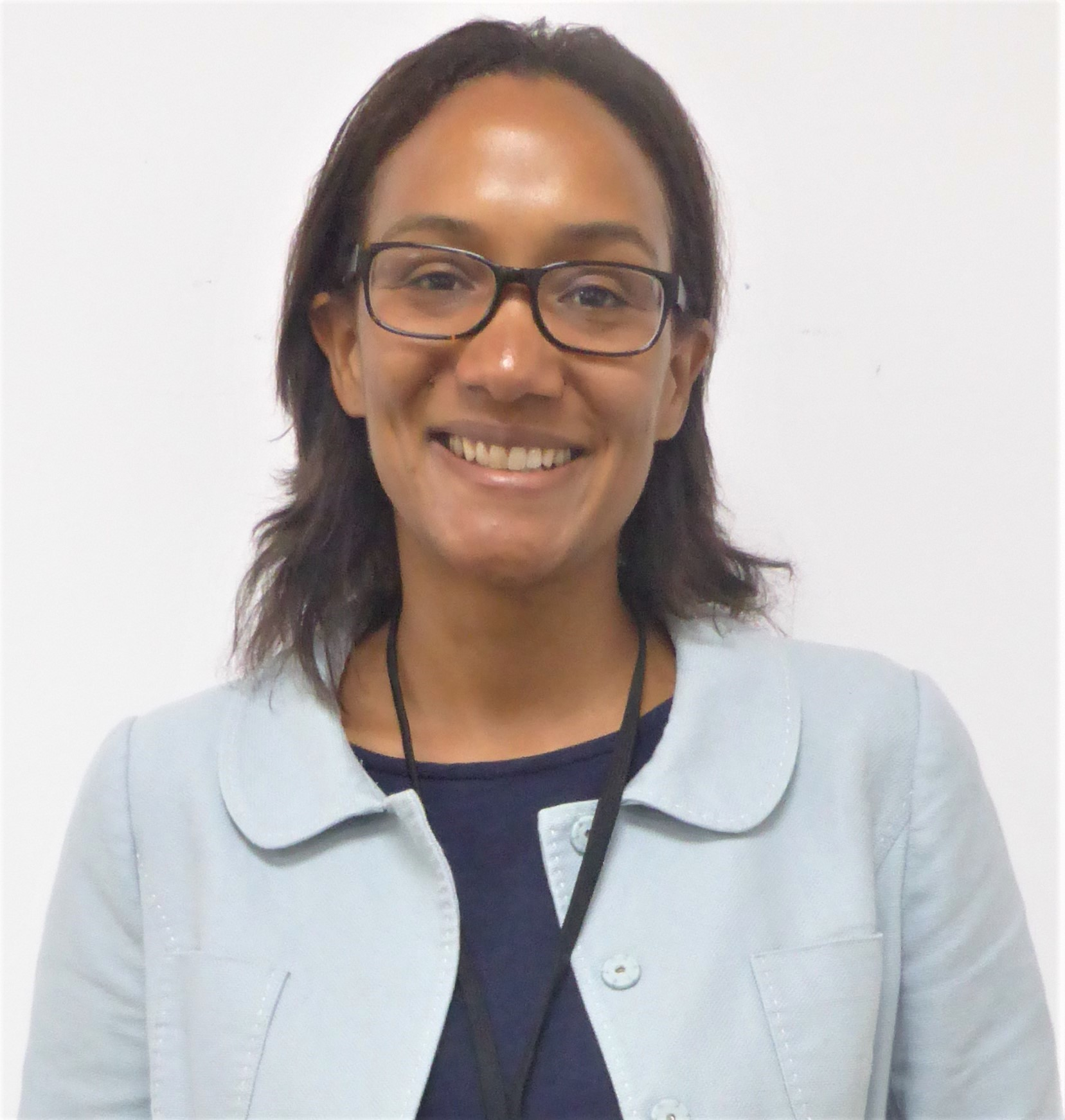
- Greenwood in 2019
- Born: Cayman Islands
- Occupation: Professor
- Awards: Runciman Award

Academic background
- Education: University of Cambridge (BA, M.Phil., PhD)
- Thesis: The Invention of the Critic. The Writer as Critic from Herodotus to Aristotle (2001)
- Doctoral advisor: Paul Cartledge

Academic work
- Discipline: Classics
- Institutions: Harvard University

Emily Greenwood is an American classicist. She is a professor of classics and comparative literature at Harvard University. She was formerly a professor of classics at the University Center for Human Values at Princeton University and the John M. Musser Professor of Classics and the chair of the department of classics at Yale University.

Her research focuses on Ancient Greek historiography, particularly Thucydides and Herodotus, the development of History as a genre and a modern critical discipline, and local and transnational black traditions of interpreting Greek and Roman classics. Her work explores the appropriation and reinvention of Greco-Roman classical antiquity from the late nineteenth century to the present.

== Early life and education ==
Greenwood has been described as "half-British, half-Ugandan, and she was born in the Cayman Islands". She won a merit scholarship to a boarding school, Sevenoaks School. She gained her B.A., M.Phil., and Ph.D. in classics at the University of Cambridge. Her PhD thesis, completed in 2001 and supervised by Professor Paul Cartledge, was entitled The Invention of the Critic. The Writer as Critic from Herodotus to Aristotle.

== Career ==
Greenwood held a junior research fellowship at St Catharine's College, Cambridge, from 2000 until 2002. She was a lecturer in Greek at the University of St Andrews from 2002 to 2008, and joined the Classics Department at Yale in 2009, where she was Professor of Classics and John M. Musser Professor of Classics from October 2020.

She received the Runciman Award in 2011 for her book Afro-Greeks: Dialogues Between Anglophone Caribbean Literature and Classics in the 20th Century (Oxford University Press, 2010).

Greenwood gave the Yale College Keynote Address on 29 August 2017 with the talk "The University we Build". In 2018 she gave the Clack lecture at the Classical Association of the Atlantic States annual meeting, "Speaking Bones: Classical Philology in Black Experimental Writing". At the same conference, a panel was organised in honour of her work. In 2019 she gave the inaugural lecture of the University of Texas at Austin Distinguished Visiting Lecture Series, “Narrative and Social Justice", speaking on “Philology and Reparation: Resisting Anti-Human Errors in ‘Great’ Books”. She is a general editor of the Cambridge University Press series 'Classics after Antiquity'.

In 2022 Greenwood was hired by Harvard in a joint professorship between the Department of Comparative Literature and Department of the Classics. In 2023 she was elected as an Honorary Fellow of Downing College, Cambridge.

== Bibliography ==
=== Monographs ===
- Thucydides and the Shaping of History (London: Duckworth, 2006)
- Homer in the Twentieth Century: Between World Literature and the Western Canon, ed. with Barbara Graziosi (Oxford: Oxford University Press, 2007)
- Reading Herodotus: A Study of the Logoi in Book 5 of Herodotus’ Histories, ed. with Elizabeth Irwin (Cambridge: Cambridge University Press, 2007)
- Afro-Greeks: Dialogues Between Anglophone Caribbean Literature and Classics in the Twentieth Century (Cambridge: Cambridge University Press, 2010)
- Classics: A Beginner's Guide (Oneworld Publications, 2024)

=== Articles and book chapters ===
- 'Middle Passages: Mediating Classics and Radical Philology in Marlene Nourbese Philip and Derek Walcott', Classicisms in the Black Atlantic, edited by Ian Moyer, Adam Lecznar, and Heidi Morse (Oxford: Oxford University Press, 2020) pp. 29–56
- 'Thucydideses: Authorship, Anachrony, and Anachronism in Greek historiography', Classical Receptions Journal 12/1. Special Issue on Anachronism, 2020, pp. 32–45
- ‘Subaltern Classics in Anti- and Post-Colonial Literatures in English’, The Oxford History of Classical Reception in English Literature, vol. 5: 1880–2000, edited by Kenneth Haynes (Oxford: Oxford University Press, 2019) pp. 576–607
- 'Fictions of Dialogue in Thucydides', The End of Dialogue in Antiquity, edited by Simon Goldhill (Cambridge: Cambridge University Press, 2008)
