= John Gould (classicist) =

British classical scholar (1927–2001)

John Gould FBA
- Born: 20 December 1927; John Philip Algernon Gould
- Died: 19 October 2001 (aged 73)

Academic background
- Education: Jesus College, Cambridge

Academic work
- Discipline: Classics
- Sub-discipline: Greek tragedy; ancient Greek literature; ancient Greek religion; anthropology
- Institutions: Jesus College, Cambridge; Christ Church, Oxford; University College of Swansea; University of Bristol

John Philip Algernon Gould, FBA (20 December 1927 – 19 October 2001) was a British classical scholar. He specialised in Greek tragedy, but also had wider interests in ancient Greek literature, ancient Greek religion and anthropology. He began his academic career as a research fellow at Jesus College, Cambridge (1949–1953), and then a tutor and student (i.e. fellow) at Christ Church, Oxford (1954–1968). He was Chair of Classics at the University College of Swansea from 1968 to 1974, and the H O Wills Professor of Greek at the University of Bristol from 1974 to 1991.

== Early life and education ==
Gould was born on 20 December 1927. His father was Harold Gould, a school teacher of Latin, and his mother was Marjorie Gould, a lecturer in French at Birkbeck College, London. He was educated at Wellingborough School, a private school in Wellingborough, Northamptonshire, and University College School, an independent school in Hampstead, London. Having been awarded a scholarship, he studied the Classical Tripos at Jesus College, Cambridge, graduating with a double first Bachelor of Arts (BA) degree in 1948: he was awarded a "special merit" in ancient philosophy.

Having completed his undergraduate degree, Gould was required to undertake eighteen months of National Service. Following officer training, he was commissioned in the Royal Army Educational Corps as a second lieutenant on 4 February 1949. In one obituary, it was stated that "he did not greatly enjoy army life".

== Academic career ==
In 1950, following his military service, Gould returned to Jesus College, Cambridge. Under the supervision of John Raven, he undertook research on Plato which would eventually become his first book: The Development of Plato’s Ethics (1955). Having held a college research studentship for the first two years, he was then made a research fellow at Jesus College.

In 1953, following a lunch with E. R. Dodds, he was offered and accepted the post of college lecturer at Christ Church, Oxford. A year later, he was elected a student (i.e. fellow) of Christ Church and appointed as tutor in Greek and Latin literature. He devoted his time to teaching and, along with the help of one other classics tutor at Christ Church, he was required to cover the full syllabus of the literae humaniores (ie classics) degree. This left little time for preparing publications, and in his fifteen years at the college, he wrote and published "no more than a few reviews of books".

In 1968, Gould left Oxford to take up the Chair of Greek at University College, Swansea. The same year, his long-time collaboration with David Lewis consisting of a major revision of Pickard-Cambridge's The Dramatic Festivals of Athens was finally published. This reflected Gould's field of study as literary specialist, with "the deepest interest in historical and cultural contexts". He was involved in reforming the classics department, with the introduction of courses studying ancient literature in translation and a joint-honours ancient history degree for those with no Latin or Ancient Greek. He also served as editor of the Classical Quarterly from 1968 to 1974.

In 1974, Gould moved to the University of Bristol where he had been appointed H O Wills Professor of Greek. In addition to his university post, due to his passion for promoting the study of ancient Greek, he served as chair the Joint Association of Classical Teachers (JACT) Steering Committee between 1974 and 1979. During his chairmanship, the JACT produced and published the Reading Greek (1978) introductory textbook for adult learners of Ancient Greek. His time at Bristol was most productive in terms of publications: including journal articles, literary reviews, and the monograph Herodotus (1989) which was awarded the Runciman Award in 1990. One of his articles, published in 1980, was titled "Law, custom and myth: the social position of women in classical Athens": it was an early application of feminist theory and structuralism to Greek society, and also reflected his interest in applying anthropology to classical study.

By the mid-1980s, he was suffering from progressively worse ill health. He retired from Bristol in 1991. He then undertook some part-time teaching at New College, Oxford, and held a visiting fellowship at Stanford University in 1993. His final academic paper was delivered at the conference in memory of George Forrest in July 2000.

== Personal life ==
While at University College School, Gould met and began a relationship with Pauline Bending. The couple were married by the time Gould moved to the University of Oxford in 1954. Pauline worked as a nurse, then as a teacher, and finally as a social worker. Together they had four children.

In 1974, Gould began an affair with Gillian Tuckett, a school teacher who had attended his Ancient Greek summer school. They separated from their respective spouses and married each other. Gould became step-father to Gillian's three children, and would have "almost no contact" with the children from his first marriage for the rest of his life.

Gould was left-wing in his politics and a committed socialist. During the 1960s, he was active in campaigning for Labour Party candidates in local elections in and around Oxford; one of whom was Gerry Fowler, a fellow classicist who was elected as an MP in 1966. In later life, he would leave the Labour Party due to what he perceived as anti-socialist policies.

Gould was ill in later life, having developed Sjögren's syndrome and suffering detached retinas in both eyes (only one eye could be saved). He was diagnosed with lymphatic cancer and died on 19 October 2001, aged 73.

== Honours ==
In 1990, Gould was awarded the Runciman Award by the Anglo-Hellenic League for his book Herodotus (1989).

In 1991, Gould was elected a Fellow of the British Academy (FBA), the United Kingdom's national academy for the humanities and social sciences.

== Selected works ==
- Gould, John (1955). The Development of Plato's Ethics. Cambridge: Cambridge University Press.
- Gould, John (1980). "Law, custom and myth: Aspects of the social position of women in classical Athens". The Journal of Hellenic Studies. 100: 38–59. doi:10.2307/630731. JSTOR 630731.
- Gould, John (1989). Herodotus. London: Weidenfeld and Nicolson. ISBN 978-0297793397.
- Gould, John (2001). Myth, ritual, memory, and exchange: essays in Greek literature and culture. Oxford: Oxford University Press. ISBN 978-0198152996.
