= Adrienne Mayor =

Historian of folk science (born 1946)

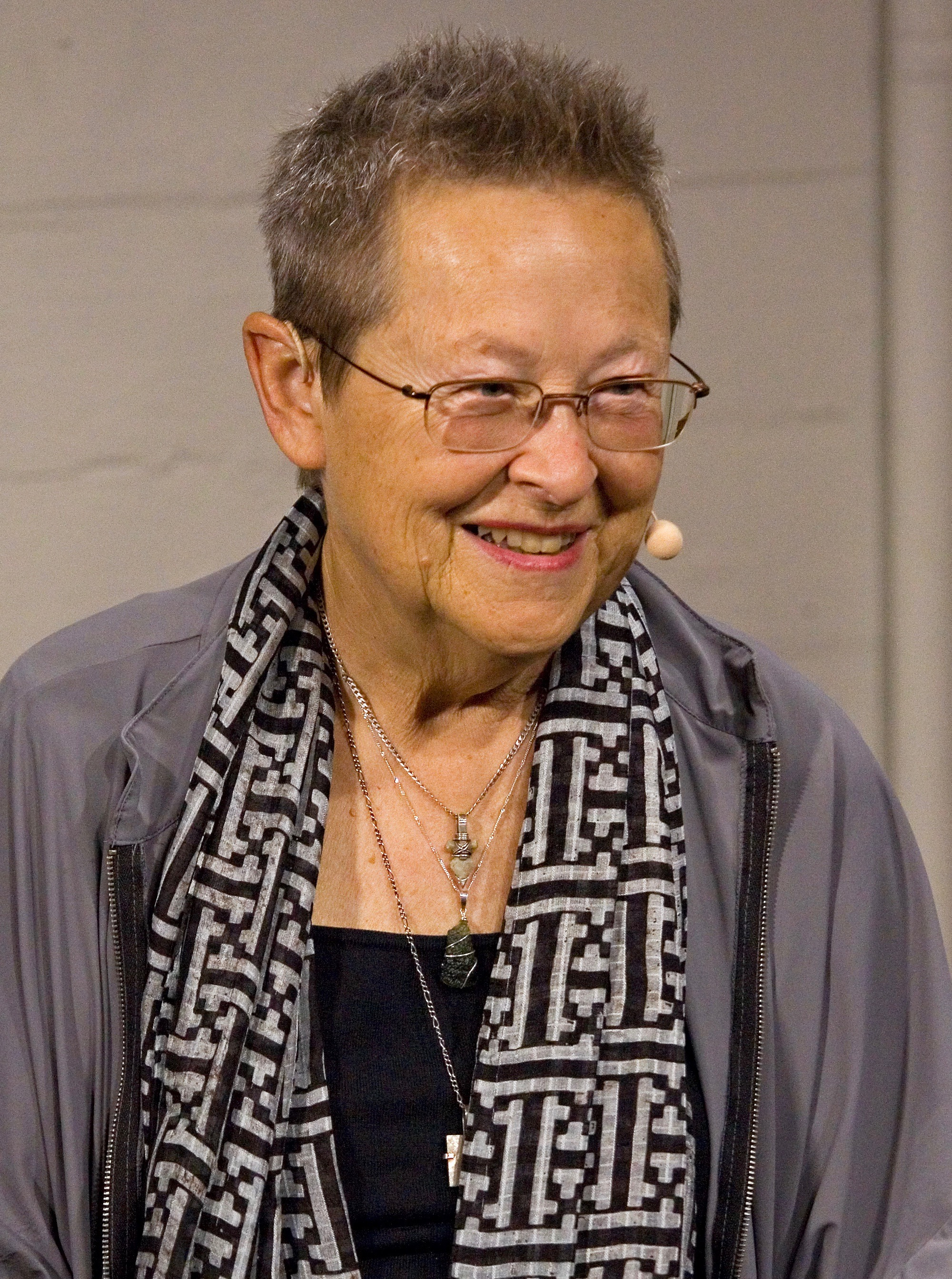
- Mayor in 2019
- Born: April 22, 1946 (age 80); Benton, Illinois, U.S.
- Occupation: Historian
- Employer: Stanford University

Adrienne Mayor (born April 22, 1946) is a historian of ancient science and a classical folklorist.

Mayor specializes in ancient history and the study of "folk science", or how pre-scientific cultures interpreted data about the natural world, and how these interpretations form the basis of many ancient myths, folklore and popular beliefs. Her work in pre-scientific fossil discoveries and traditional interpretations of paleontological has contributed to the emerging field of geomythology as well studies of classical folklore.

Her 2011 work The First Fossil Hunters: Dinosaurs, Mammoths, and Myth in Greek and Roman Times discusses the influence of dinosaur fossils on Greco-Roman myth, particularly griffins, centaurs, giants, and the Cyclopes stories. Mayor's book, Greek Fire, Poison Arrows, & the Scorpion Bombs from 2022 details the evolution of ancient poison weaponry and tactics in to modern biological and chemical warfare.

== Life ==
Mayor spent part of her early life in South Dakota.

From 1980 to 1996, she worked as a copy editor, and printmaker. Mayor decided to pursue geomythology after studying accounts of fossil discoveries by Ancient Greeks and Romans.

Since 2006, Mayor has been a research scholar in the Classics Department and the History and Philosophy of Science Program at Stanford University.

Mayor has published books and articles on the history of automatons, Amazons, unconventional warfare, ancient automatons, toxic honey, tattoos in antiquity, smallpox blankets in history and legend, assassination by poisoned garments in Mughal India, fossil-related legends, fossil-related place names, and other topics in scholarly journals and popular magazines, including History Today, Lapham Quarterly, Noema, Journal of American Folklore, Archaeology, Natural History, MHQ: The Quarterly Journal of Military History, Gizmodo, The Conversation, and Foreign Affairs. Her books The First Fossil Hunters and Fossil Legends of the First Americans were both praised in Central Connecticut State anthropology department member Kenneth L. Feder's book Frauds, Myths, and Mysteries: Science and Pseudoscience in Archaeology—a book dedicated to debunking pseudoarcheological claims.

Her books have been translated into French, German, Spanish, Japanese, Chinese, Korean, Hungarian, Polish, Turkish, Italian, Russian, Arabic, and Greek and have been featured in documentaries on the History Channel, the Discovery Channel, and the BBC. She has lectured at the American Museum of Natural History, Boston Museum of Fine Art, Smithsonian, Art Institute of Chicago, Getty Museum, among other venues, and has been interviewed on NPR, BBC, and Coast to Coast AM. Her biography of Mithradates VI Eupator, The Poison King, was a nonfiction finalist for the National Book Award 2009.

From 2011 to 2017, Mayor was a regular contributor to the history of science website Wonders and Marvels.

In 2018–19, she was a Berggruen Fellow at the Center for Advanced Study in the Behavioral Sciences, Stanford, her research dedicated to the impulse to create artificial life, whether that be today's artificial intelligence or the animated statues of myth. The fruits of this research are contained in her book, Gods and Robots: Myths, Machines, and Ancient Dreams of Technology.

== Bibliography ==
=== The First Fossil Hunters (2000) ===
Mayor's first book, The First Fossil Hunters: Paleontology in Greek and Roman Times, investigated discoveries and interpretations of dinosaur and other large vertebrate fossils in classical antiquity, and proposed that ancient observations of the fossilized remains of mammoths, mastodons, dinosaurs, and other extinct species influenced belief in giants, heroes, the griffin and some other fabulous beings of myth and legend. This book is the basis for the popular History Channel show "Ancient Monster Hunters" and the BBC show Dinosaurs, Myths and Monsters and several museum exhibits. A National Geographic children's book by Marc Aronson, The Griffin and the Dinosaur (2014) describes Mayor's hypothesis that ancient observations of Protoceratops dinosaur fossils influenced ancient images and tales of Griffins.

==== Reception ====
In American Journal of Archaeology, Deborah Ruscillo, Washington University in St. Louis, writes that this multidisciplinary book is written so that a layperson not well-versed in the topics it delves into may understand it. While Ruscillo does disagree with some of the assertions Mayor makes, she recommends the book to anthropologists and non-anthropologists alike. In Isis: A Journal of the History of Science, Liliane Bodson, University of Liege, writes that “Mayor’s thought-provoking book will mark a watershed in the approach to griffins and giants.” While she found some of Mayor's views one-sided, she still recommended the book to “every historian of natural sciences.”

=== Greek Fire, Poison Arrows & Scorpion Bombs (2003) ===
Greek Fire, Poison Arrows & Scorpion Bombs: Biological and Chemical Warfare in the Ancient World, Mayor's second book, uncovers the earliest examples of biochemical weapons in the ancient world, to demonstrate that the concept and practice of biochemical warfare occurred much earlier than was previously thought. One of the book's purposes is to dispel the idea that ancient warfare was inherently more honorable than modern warfare. She presents ancient Greek, Roman, Chinese, African, and Indian historical accounts of the practice of biochemical warfare, using animal, bacterial, poison, and chemical weaponry, including Greek fire. "An illuminating revision of early military history," this book has become a favorite of ancient war gamers and was featured in the History Channel show "Ancient Greek WMDs."

==== Reception ====
Classicist Richard Stoneman praises the book, stating that it should be “widely read”, and specifically praises the wide range of sources used, especially her employment of sources from India. In Library Journal, Brian DeLuca feels that the use of modern terminology in relation to ancient methods of warfare is “anachronistic” and finds Mayor's arguments for ancient biowarfare unconvincing. Even so, he recommends the book for “larger public libraries, specialized collections, and academic libraries.” In Naval War College Review, author and lieutenant colonel Zygmunt Dembek highly recommends the book because of its unique point of view.

=== Fossil Legends of the First Americans (2005) ===
Mayor's third book gathers Native American accounts of discoveries of dinosaur and other fossils and oral traditions about their meaning, from pre-Columbian times to the present. Much of the focus of the book is in challenging the idea put forth by paleontologist George Gaylord Simpson that precolonial indigenous peoples of the Americas did not take notice of the many fossils found on the continent. The book is organized by geographic location of fossils. It has been featured in History Channel MonsterQuest videos.

==== Reception ====
According to Bryce Christianson, for the American Library Association, Mayor "illuminates the surprisingly relevant views of early peoples confronting evidence of prehistoric life" in a "pioneering work [that] replaces cultural estrangement with belated understanding." Norman MacLeod (Natural History Museum, London), writes in Paleontologia Electronica that he was “disappointed” in the book, although Mayor "has done a great service to Native Americans by collecting together many of their legends, including many that had previously been unrecorded." In his review for Geological Magazine, Paul D. Taylor (Natural History Museum, London) writes that the book will appeal to palaeontologists, anthropologists, and folklorists,” as well as geologists.

=== The Poison King (2009) ===
In her fourth book, The Poison King: The Life and Legend of Mithradates, Rome's Deadliest Enemy, Mayor details the story of the life of Mithradates, leader of the ancient Black Sea kingdom of Pontus, who, in the 1st century B.C., did everything he could to overthrow the Roman Republic. The book attempts to relay events from the Pontic point of view, as opposed to the Roman point of view. The Poison King was one of five nonfiction finalists in the National Book Awards, 2009, and has been translated into Italian, German, Russian, Turkish, and Spanish.

==== Reception ====
Peter Stothard, author and editor of TLS Times Literary Supplement, praises Mayor's "fascinating" biographical account, noting that she "aims to rescue [Mithradates'] reputation from biographical accounts that have come mostly from his enemies" by "making full imaginative use both of her own broad knowledge and the often frail ancient source material." In Melbourne Historical Journal, Jeroen W.P. Wijnendaele writes that Mayor has crafted an entertaining book about Mithradates's life, but felt that the passages about the use of poison are “repetitive.” In Isis: Journal of the History of Science Society, Laurence Totelin remarks on small errors but approved of the good bibliography and deems the book a good introduction to the story of Mithradates. Author Carolyn See's review in The Washington Post, calls The Poison King a "wonderful reading experience, bracing as a tonic," providing a perspective that is "thrilling" while providing "calm and distance" on a terrifying age.

=== The Amazons (2014) ===
Mayor's fifth book, The Amazons: Lives and Legends of Warrior Women across the Ancient World, surveys ancient myths, legends, folklore, art, and archaeology related to warlike women known to the classical Greeks as Amazons. This is the first comprehensive account of warrior women in myth and history from the Mediterranean world to China. It also includes information on the linguistic origins of the word “Amazon" and details how nomadic horsewomen-archers of the steppes influenced ideas of warrior women.

==== Reception ====
Jasmin W. Cyril wrote in Kadin/Woman 2000 that “any reader or researcher will be well rewarded through a perusal of this monograph and will find immeasurable advantage in the notes and bibliography.” In the American Journal of Philology, classicist Alison Keith criticized Mayor's tendency to make unsubstantiated assertions, treat folklore as fact, and neglect context for some sources; Keith felt that the book was “rich in research but weak in accepted methods of scholarship.” In the New Statesman, classics professor Edith Hall declared the book was more than "an important contribution to ancient history," opening "up new horizons in world storytelling and feminist iconography [with] rigorous scholarship and poetic charm." Hall argued that by "painstaking research into the literature, folklore and ancient traditions of the myriad peoples between Greece, Russia and China, especially the Kyrgyz, the Azerbaijanis and the Circassians of Caucasia, [Mayor] has broken down the often impenetrable walls dividing western cultural history from its eastern equivalents."

=== Gods and Robots: Myths, Machines, and Ancient Dreams of Technology (2018) ===
Mayor's sixth book analyzes classical Greek myths and other ancient cultures' tales about fabricating artificial life, automatons, self-moving devices, and Artificial Intelligence. The final chapter describes real robots, animated statues, and self-propelled machines that were actually designed and constructed in the classical and Hellenistic eras.

==== Reception ====
Kirkus Reviews describes the book as “a collection of wondrous tales that present ancient myths as the proto-science fiction stories they are.” Classicist Peter Thonemann calls the book "absorbing" and "accessible and engaging," but feels that the ancient quest for eternal youth should not be included as an example of "artificial life" and wishes for deeper analysis of direct lines from Aristotle to modern AI. Mayor's book is "a thought-provoking account" of "how ancient Greek, Roman, Indian, and Chinese myths expressed hopes and fears about human-made life," according to Bruce Bower in Science News while The Economist review praises the "entertaining" examination of "ancient mythology. . . chock-full of robots, androids and mechanical creatures . . . that survive in written and visual form."

== Books ==
- The First Fossil Hunters: Paleontology in Greek and Roman Times (Princeton University Press 2000; rev. 2011) — ISBN 0-691-08977-9
- Greek Fire, Poison Arrows & Scorpion Bombs: Biological and Chemical Warfare in the Ancient World (Overlook 2003; rev. 2022) — ISBN 1-58567-348-X
- Fossil Legends of the First Americans (Princeton University Press 2005) — ISBN 0-691-11345-9
- The Poison King: The Life and Legend of Mithradates, Rome's Deadliest Enemy (Princeton University Press 2009) ISBN 978-0-691-12683-8
- The Griffin and the Dinosaur: How Adrienne Mayor Discovered a Fascinating Link between Myth and Science, with Marc Aronson (National Geographic 2014) ISBN 978-1-4263-1108-6
- The Amazons: Lives and Legends of Warrior Women across the Ancient World. Princeton University Press. 21 September 2014. pp. 4–. ISBN 978-1-4008-6513-0.
- Gods and Robots: Myths, Machines, and Ancient Dreams of Technology (Princeton University Press 2018) — ISBN 978-0-691-18351-0
- Flying Snakes & Griffin Claws: And Other Classical Myths, Historical Oddities, and Scientific Curiosities (Princeton University Press 2022)
