= The First Fossil Hunters =

The First Fossil Hunters: Dinosaurs, Mammoths, and Myth in Greek and Roman Times is a 2000 work on paleoarcheology by Stanford University professor Adrienne Mayor. It was reissued in 2011.

== Summary ==
Drawing on primary Greco-Roman sources and building on recent archeological and paleontological research, Mayor argues that the eastern mediterranean and Near East presents evidence of massive late Pleistocene megafuana. These "monsters" may represent extinct branches of Elephantidae or perhaps fossil repltiles. Mayor analyzes Greek myth and local folklore while critiquing the merits of linnean taxonomy in categorizing fossil remains. She argues that Greek thinkers like Herodetus employed their own consistent methods of research and that modern understandings of historical synthesis and peer review may underestimate the fidelity of ancient thinkers.

Extinct species described include giant relatives of modern elephants, horses, and the current suite of African megafauna. Throughout, Mayor is interested in isolating griffins archeologically and distinguishing them from the half-lion/half-eagle cryptid of ancient Greek artwork. She quotes many ancient writers approvingly in their on-the-ground attempts to understand bones as large as human beings. Most of the fossils she describes are clustered in the Pleistocene but some stretch back to the Tertiary period in the millennia after the KT event.

== Chapters ==
- The Gold‑Guarding Griffin: A Paleontological Legend (pp. 15–53)
- Earthquakes and Elephants: Prehistoric Remains in Mediterranean Lands (pp. 54–103)
- Ancient Discoveries of Giant Bones (pp. 104–156)
- Artistic and Archaeological Evidence for Fossil Discoveries (pp. 157–191)
- Mythology, Natural Philosophy, and Fossils (pp. 192–226)
- Centaur Bones: Paleontological Fictions (pp. 227–254)
- Large Vertebrate Fossil Species in the Ancient World (pp. 255–282)
