= Dinosaurs, Myths and Monsters =

2011 British documentary film

- Written by: Tom Holland
- Directed by: Jamie Muir
- Presented by: Tom Holland
- Country of origin: United Kingdom

Production
- Producer: Jamie Muir

Original release
- Network: BBC Four
- Release: 14 September 2011

Dinosaurs, Myths and Monsters is a 2011 British documentary film produced by the BBC. The film premiered on BBC Four on 14 September 2011, and is presented and written by popular historian Tom Holland. Jamie Muir served as the programme's director and producer. The duration of the film is an hour.

In the spirit of Adrienne Mayor's ground-breaking studies of 2000 and 2005, the documentary explores how fossils may have influenced the mythologies of different cultures, including the Native Americans and the ancient Greeks. Mayor speculated that fossils could have led to mythological depictions of the thunderbird, the giant bird of Native American mythology, and the Cyclopes, the one-eyed giants of Greek and Roman mythology. The concept of the Cyclopes may have been derived from Greek encounters with elephant skulls. The Greeks, unfamiliar with living elephants, could have misinterpreted the skull's nose cavity as a single eye socket.

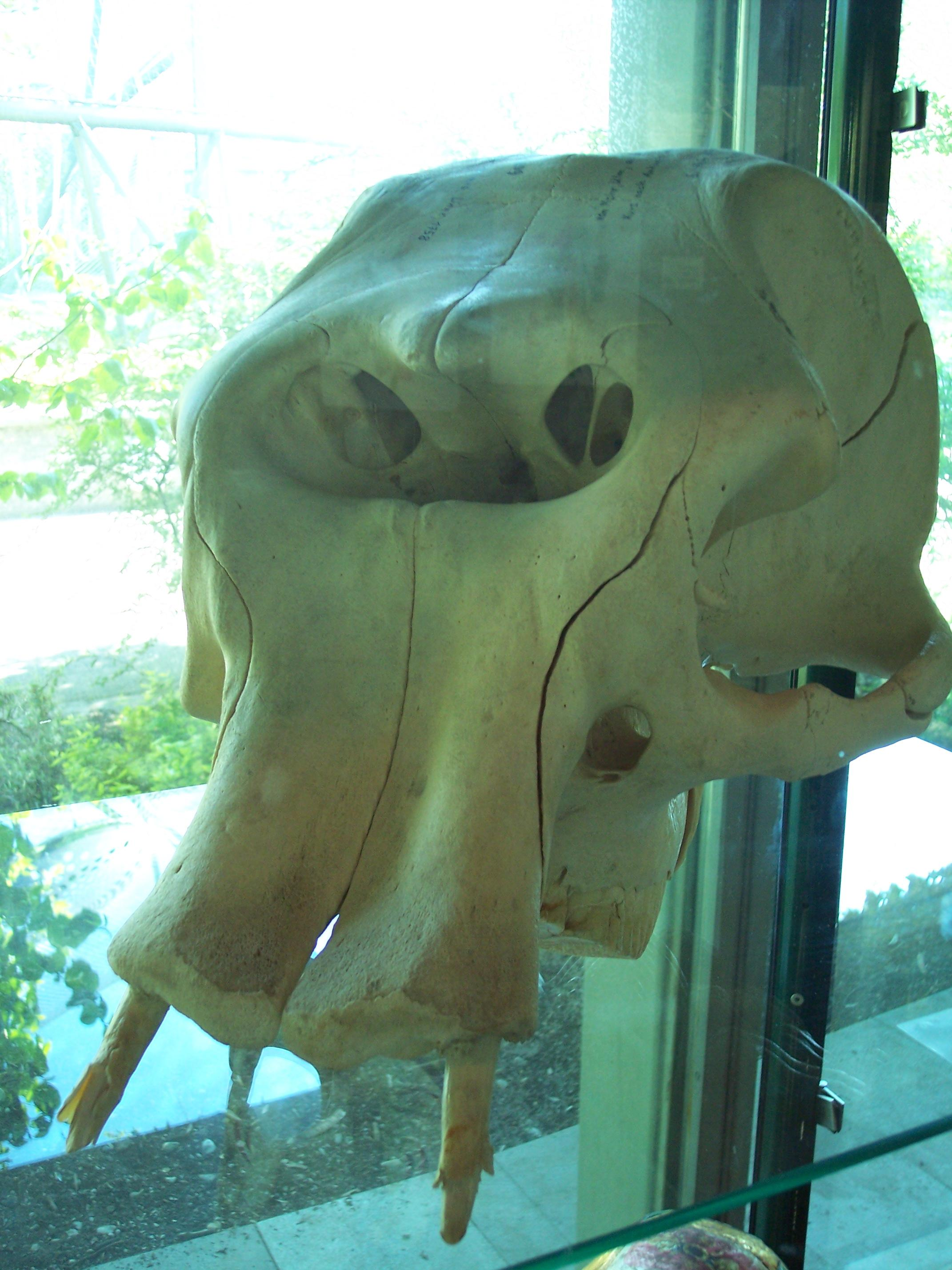
Skull of a dwarf elephant displayed in the zoo of Munich, Germany.

The film was produced alongside three other dinosaur programmes: Planet Dinosaur, How to Build a Dinosaur, and Survivors. All four programmes were commissioned by Kim Shillinglaw, the BBC's commissioning editor for Science and Natural History.

== Reception ==
Jonathan Wright of The Guardian praised the programme, calling it "precisely the kind of off-kilter but insightful documentary that explains why we need BBC Four." Rachel Cooke's review in the New Statesman was more mixed. She enjoyed the segment on Native American mythology, which she found "fascinating," but was more critical of the segment on Greek mythology, writing that "my appetite for TV historians droning on about Homer.... is, I must admit, increasingly limited." Overall, Cooke considered the film uneven, consisting of "too little interesting material being stretched too far."
