= David Malcolm Lewis =

British historian (1928–1994)

David Malcolm Lewis FBA (7 June 1928, London – 12 July 1994, Oxford) was an English historian who was Professor of Ancient History at the University of Oxford. He is most renowned for his monumental two-volume edition of the inscriptions of Archaic and Classical Athens and Attica. His breadth and depth of knowledge was so widely admired that for decades he was invited by other scholars to comment upon and improve a high proportion of all book manuscripts in the field of Greek history before they went to publication.

== Biography ==
Lewis was a "student" (that is, fellow) of Christ Church, Oxford and Professor of Ancient History at the University of Oxford. In his obituary in The Guardian newspaper (16 July 1994), it was stated that Prof. Lewis "has been, for the last two or three decades, the world's leading authority in the field of Greek epigraphy." He was also an authority in several ancillary fields, "a profoundly learned scholar in Greek history" according to the Princeton Alumni Weekly memorial tribute.

A native of London, he attended the City of London School, was an undergraduate at Corpus Christi College, Oxford (where he said he was one of the last people to be allowed to do postgraduate work without registering for a higher degree) and studied for his PhD in classics at Princeton University. He also studied at the Institute for Advanced Study in Princeton, New Jersey, the British School in Athens, and at Christ Church, Oxford.

Lewis was a scholar of ancient Greek history. Much of his work was concerned with inscriptions, but he insisted (in particular in an address to the epigraphic conference in University of Cambridge in 1967) that epigraphy should not be an activity for initiates only, but should be one means among others to the end of understanding the ancient world as fully as possible. He took a particular interest in what could be learnt from texts which even those who venture into the world of inscriptions find intimidating, accounts of expenditure and inventories of temple treasures; and this interest was extended to oriental documents, in particular the fortification tablets from Persepolis.

His Jewish faith prompted the development of a second area of expertise, Middle Eastern history.

Lewis was very proud of his work in editing three volumes on Archaic and Classical Greek history in the second edition of the Cambridge Ancient History. He published a book, Sparta and Persia, in 1977, and a shorter work, The Jews of Oxford, in 1992. He also edited several Oxford publications in the classics, including The Decrees of the Greek States published posthumously in 1997. He also published hundreds of book reviews, as many as eighteen appearing in a single year (1977).

== Education ==
- City of London School
- Corpus Christi College, Oxford (MA)
- Princeton University (PhD)

== Career ==
- National Service with RAEC, 1949–51
- Member, Institute for Advanced Study, Princeton, 1951–52, 1964–65
- Student, British School at Athens, 1952–54
- Research Fellow, Corpus Christi College, Oxford, 1954–55
- Tutor in Ancient History, Christ Church, Oxford, 1955–85
- Student of Christ Church, Oxford, 1956–94
- University Lecturer in Greek Epigraphy, Oxford, 1956–85
- Professor of Ancient History, Oxford, 1985–94

== Publications ==
- Sir Arthur Pickard-Cambridge, The Dramatic Festivals of Athens, 2nd edn 1968 (ed with John Gould)
- Greek Historical Inscriptions, 1969 (with Russell Meiggs)
- Sparta and Persia, 1977
- Inscriptiones Graecae I [Attica before 403 B.C.], 3rd edition, 1981–94
- (ed) Cambridge Ancient History, vol IV, 1988, vol. V, 1992, vol. VI, 1994
- The Jews of Oxford, 1992
- Selected Papers in Greek and Near Eastern History (ed. P. J. Rhodes), 1997
