= Persian Fire =

2005 book by Tom Holland

Persian Fire: The First World Empire and the Battle for the West
- The first edition cover.
- Author: Tom Holland
- Language: English
- Subject: Achaemenid Persian Empire
- Publisher: Little, Brown Book Group
- Publication date: 2005
- Publication place: United Kingdom
- English publication date: 2005
- Media type: Paperback
- ISBN: 9780349117171
- OCLC: 730091756
- Preceded by: Rubicon: The Last Years of the Roman Republic
- Followed by: Millennium

Persian Fire: The First World Empire and the Battle for the West is a historical study of the Persian Empire by popular historian Tom Holland, first published in 2005. It won the Runciman Award.

== Reviews ==
James Buchan, writing in The Guardian gave the book a mostly positive review, praising Holland's writing as 'clear and uncluttered' and calling the set pieces 'thrilling'. However, he also criticized Holland's reliance on an unreliable source for information regarding the Spartan constitution and called some of the details 'anachronistic'.

Geraldine Bedell, writing in The Observer gave Persian Fire a wholly positive review, calling it 'fascinating'.

Dominic Sandbrook writing in The Telegraph gave Persian Fire a mixed review, calling it 'spirited and engaging' but criticizing Holland's attempts to compare the ancient world and the 21st century.

Christopher Hart writing under the name William Napier in The Independent gave Persian Fire a positive review, calling it 'masterly and gripping'

A mostly positive review in Kirkus Reviews praised the battle scenes as 'stirring' but called Holland's 'East-versus-West' notion 'anachronistic'.

A review in Publishers Weekly was positive, stating 'Holland's graceful, modern voice will captivate those intimidated by Herodotus'
