= Rowland Mainstone =

Civil engineer and author

Rowland J. Mainstone (1923-2020) was a civil engineer who spent most of his career at the Building Research Station investigating, for example, the structural responses of framed buildings to various loadings. In his own time, he studied historic buildings and became an acknowledged international expert on historic masonry domes, advising building owners on structural conservation, and lecturing in academia on developments in structural form. He published widely in books and monographs, specialist journals and encyclopaedia entries.

== Early career ==
Rowland Mainstone was born in 1923. He studied civil engineering at the University of Liverpool, and spent part of the Second World War in the RAF. In 1948 he joined the Building Research Station (now the Building Research Establishment) where he remained for 31 years until 1979. Here he was involved in the structural responses of bridges and framed buildings to normal, occasional and accidental dynamic loads, such as helicopter landings and explosions. He contributed to numerous publications including guidance documents and monographs, such as those published by the American Society of Civil Engineers.

== Historic buildings and conservation ==
Independent of his employment, Mainstone studied the history of structural engineering and historic buildings, specifically masonry and concrete domed structures, and published widely in books, monographs, specialist journals and encyclopaedia entries. His publications on domes include articles about the domes of Hagia Sophia, Florence Cathedral, and St Peters in Rome.

Mainstone acted as a consultant on structural aspects of building conservation and restoration, and was Visiting Professor of architecture, structures, and structural conservation at University College, London, University of Leeds, and the Catholic University of Leuven.

== Books ==
Among several books, his critically acclaimed Developments in Structural Form first published in 1975 was issued in a second edition by the Architectural Press in 1998, and remains a standard text. His 288-page book on Hagia Sophia: Architecture, Structure and Liturgy of Justinian's Great Church was published by Thames & Hudson in 1988. Structure in Architecture: history, design and innovation, 436 pages, was published by Routledge in 1999.
