= Sharon E. J. Gerstel =

Byzantine art historian and archeologist

- Born: New York City, New York, U.S.
- Education: Bryn Mawr College; New York University

Sharon E. J. Gerstel (Greek: Σάρον Γκερστέλ) is an American art historian and archaeologist. She is Professor of Byzantine Art & Archaeology, George P. Kolovos Family Centennial Term Chair in Hellenic Studies, and Director of the UCLA Stavros Niarchos Foundation (SNF) Center for the Study of Hellenic Culture.

== Life ==
Sharon E. J. Gerstel was born in New York City. She attended Bryn Mawr College and the Institute of Fine Arts at New York University where she studied Byzantine Art History and History.

After completing studies and fieldwork in Thessaloniki, she joined the faculty of the University of Maryland, where she taught Byzantine art history from 1994-2004 holding, at the same time, a position at Dumbarton Oaks.

In 2005, she joined the faculty of the UCLA where she was promoted to Full Professor in 2007. From 2016-2018, she served as Associate Director of the Center for Medieval and Renaissance Studies at UCLA and was named inaugural director of the UCLA Stavros Niarchos Foundation Center for the Study of Hellenic Culture in 2019, a position she continues to hold.

Her research focuses primarily on village communities in Greece, and particularly on the province of Laconia. In 2014, together with Chris Kyriakakis (Professor of Electrical Engineering, USC), Gerstel and a team of scholars undertook research on the acoustics of Byzantine churches in Thessaloniki. In 2023, as part of the program Gefyra, funded by the Stavros Niarchos Foundation, she initiated a collaboration with the Cultural Society of Geraki to study and publish traditional weavings from the village.

In 2020, Gerstel criticized plans to convert the Hagia Sophia into a mosque, calling it "anti-Orthodox" and "an attempt at cultural erasure".

== Personal life ==
Gerstel moved to Los Angeles in 2005. She has one child.

== Awards and recognition ==
In recognition of her service to the Hellenic Republic, she was awarded honorary citizenship in 2021 and, in the same year, was named a Commander of the Order of the Phoenix, one of Greece’s highest honors. For her publications, she has been awarded the prestigious Runciman Prize, the inaugural book prize by the International Center for Medieval Art (ICMA), and the Maria Theochari Prize by the Christian Archaeological Society in Greece.

She has been the recipient of numerous fellowships, including a 2010 Guggenheim Fellowship in Medieval History. She was also awarded the Theodore Saloutos Award by the American Hellenic Council in 2019 and was honored, in the same year, by the Hellenic Society of Constantinople.

== Notable publications ==
=== Books and edited volumes ===
- Beholding the Sacred Mysteries: Programs of the Byzantine Sanctuary, CAA Monograph on the Fine Arts LVI (Seattle and London: University of Washington Press, 1999).
- Rural Lives and Landscapes in Late Byzantium: Art, Archaeology, and Ethnography.
- Gerstel, Sharon E. J.; Lauffenburger, J. (2001). A Lost Art Rediscovered: The Architectural Ceramics of Byzantium. University Park, PA: Penn State University Press.
- Thresholds of the Sacred: Architectural, Art Historical, Liturgical, and Theological Perspectives on Religious Screens, East and West. Dumbarton Oaks. 2006.
- Gerstel, Sharon E. J. (2013). Viewing the Morea: Land and People in the Late Medieval Peloponnese. Harvard University Press.
- Gerstel, Sharon E. J.; Pitouli, S. (2024). Weaving Dreams: Kilims from Geraki, Laconia. Athens: Benaki Museum.

=== Articles and book chapters ===
- Gerstel, Sharon E. J. (1997). "St. Eudokia and the Imperial Household of Leo VI". The Art Bulletin. 79 (4): 699–707. doi:10.1080/00043079.1997.10786807.
- “Recording Village History: The Church of Hagioi Theodoroi, Vamvaka,” Journal of Modern Greek Studies 38 (2020), 21-42.
- Gerstel, Sharon E. J. (2023). "Laskarina Bouboulina Imagined: Portraits of a Greek Heroine". In Kalogeropoulos, A. (ed.). Bouboulina and the Greek Revolution: Interdisciplinary Perspectives on the Heroine of 1821. Lanham, MD: Householder. pp. 149–79.

=== Interviews in popular journals and newspapers ===
- "Σάρον Γκέρστελ για τα αρχαία της Βενιζέλου: 'Η καρδιά μου ραγίζει για αυτό που θα συμβεί'". tvxs.gr (in Greek). April 30, 2021.
- "Hagia Sophia stripped of museum status, paving its return to a mosque". National Geographic. July 10, 2020.

== Filmography ==
- “Inside the Atelier,” Creator. Documents a book project for children from Los Angeles’ first ‘parent trigger’ school.
- “Blessings and Vows,” Executive Producer, 2018. Public impact research in Vamvaka, Mani.
