= Gillian Evans =

British philosopher and academic

Gillian Evans FRHistS
- Title: Professor of Medieval Theology and Intellectual History

Academic background
- Education: King Edward VI High School for Girls, Birmingham
- Alma mater: St Anne's College, Oxford; University of Reading; Middlesex University

Gillian Rosemary Evans FRHistS is a British philosopher, and emeritus professor of medieval theology and intellectual history at University of Cambridge.

Evans was educated at King Edward VI High School for Girls, Birmingham, followed by a degree in history from St Anne's College, Oxford, and a postgraduate diploma in education. She earned her PhD from Reading University writing about Anselm of Canterbury.

In 2002, Evans was appointed professor of medieval theology and intellectual history at Cambridge University. This had followed a long period of successive but denied applications for promotion to professorship. This long period was so notable that a scholar in an overlapping field at the University, Professor David Dumville, took the highly unusual step in a University Discussion (formal meetings of Regent House members) of wheeling in a trolleyload of Evans's publications, by way of demonstration of her output.

== Academic freedom and democracy ==
Evans is a campaigner for academic freedom and democracy. She is a member of Council for Academic Freedom and Academic Standards and qualified as a barrister to assist academics with grievances against their institutions. She regularly writes and speaks in opposition to managerialist trends in university administration. As an Emeritus Professor, she has continued relentless scrutiny of the administration of the University of Cambridge, submitting forensic contributions to many University Discussions. In a July 2020 discussion she challenged the constitutionality of the response of the University Council to the COVID-19 pandemic arguing that the powers of the Regent House, the sovereign body of the University, "were simply seized and handed over indefinitely by the Council and the General Board".

== Publications ==
- Alan of Lille: The Frontiers of Theology in the Later Twelfth Century (Cambridge: Cambridge University Press, 1983) ISBN 978-0521246187
- The Language and Logic of the Bible: The Earlier Middle Ages (Cambridge: Cambridge University Press, 1984), ISBN 0521263719
- The Language and Logic of the Bible: A Road to Reformation (Cambridge: Cambridge University Press, 1985) ISBN 0521305489
- Bernard of Clairvaux (Oxford: Oxford University Press, 2000) ISBN 0195125258
- The University of Cambridge: A New History (London: I.B. Tauris, 2010) ISBN 9781848851153
- The University of Oxford: A New History (London: I.B. Tauris, 2010) ISBN 9781848851146
- A Short History of Medieval Christianity (London: I.B. Tauris, 2017) ISBN 9781784532826
- Crown, Mitre and People in the Nineteenth Century Church: The Church of England, Establishment and the State (Cambridge: Cambridge University Press, 2021) ISBN 9781316515976
- After North: Two Decades of Change at Oxford University (Oxford: Holywell Press, 2022) ISBN 9781399929189
