= In the Shadow of the Sword (book) =

Book by Tom Holland

In the Shadow of the Sword: The Battle for Global Empire and the End of the Ancient World
- First edition
- Author: Tom Holland
- Language: English
- Subject: Islam
- Publisher: Little, Brown
- Publication date: 2012
- Publication place: United Kingdom
- Pages: 544
- ISBN: 978-1408700075
- OCLC: 900788954

In the Shadow of the Sword (2012) is a history book charting the origins of Islam by Tom Holland.

== Scholarship ==
The work draws from the revisionist school of Islamic studies and the scholarship of Patricia Crone (with further refinements produced by John Wansbrough, Fred Donner, Andrew Rippin, Christoph Luxenberg et al) in applying rigorous textual analysis to the Hadithic corpus.

Holland asserts that the oldest extant biographical details about Muhammad are writings by theological scholars post-dating his death by nearly two hundred years who needed to justify their tools and authority, that there is no mention of the Quran or any associated commentary in any source till as late as eighth century AD and that Mecca is not located to any geographical precision in the Quran.

The one (Ibn Hisham's biography of Prophet) features angels; the other gods. Why, then, should we believe that the account of the Prophet's first great victory is any more authentic than the legend of the siege of Troy?

— Tom Holland, In the Shadow of the Sword: The Battle for Global Empire and the End of the Ancient World

Emphasizing on these premises, he questions the mainstream view on early days of Islam deriving from later-era Muslim sources as entirely flawed in its conflation of literature with history and instead, seeks to sketch a broad-brush revisionist history about the development of Islam as a socio-political response to the gradual rise of Arabs over two centuries. Holland holds that Quranic imagery does not tally with desert Arabia and assigns Islam's birth-place to be Syria-Palestine; he goes on to retrieve Muhammad as a member of a literate Jordanian elite who knew the power of faith and say that Gabriel's revelations along with other mainstay features of Islam were actually perfected editions of a set of ideas borrowed from the changing societies in the Near East and existing religions.

== Reception ==
=== Favorable ===
Dan Jones, writing for The Daily Telegraph, praised Holland for his impressive scholarship, penned in similarly impressive prose. In the end, he broached — "Is this Satanic Verses territory?" — something Holland himself referenced at the very beginning of the book.

Anthony Sattin, writing in The Guardian, admired Holland for his provocative work which boldly re-examined the earliest spans of Islam. Malise Ruthven, reviewing for The Wall Street Journal noted it as a magisterial tour-de-force wherein Holland convincingly connected the end of empires with the rise of Islam.

=== Mixed ===
Barnaby Rogerson, writing for The Independent, noted the work to be extraordinarily rich, detailed and enchanting; his writing was praised in particular. He however noted that the sources offered by Holland, even from the non-Muslim world, supported the mainstream scholarship at large and appeared to have been misused by Holland in pursuit of his point; Holland's repositioning of Islam's place of origin to be Syria-Palestine and doubts about Mecca's position were held as wild and unconvincing.

Richard Miles, writing in the Financial Times, noted it to be an exhilarating read which was ultra-skeptical of Islamic sources and highly confrontational. At the end, he posed the questions: "And if much of the history of early Islam is fabricated, then how to explain the consensus that exists across a range of texts from bitterly opposed sectarian communities (Sunni, Shia, etc)? Do we really believe that an entire community invested in this vast lie about the prophet, and that somehow some shadowy force was able to control all dissenting opinion within Arab circles?"

=== Negative ===
Historian Glen Bowersock wrote a scathing review in The Guardian, holding the work to be titillating yet grossly irresponsible and unreliable. Bowersock criticised Holland for his lack of linguistic proficiency in any of the oriental tongues, which Bowersock said led to Holland making linguistic errors and being completely dependent on translations and secondary sources. Bowersock also said that Holland was ignorant of decades of research on pre-Islamic Arabia, and that he failed to account for the recent discoveries of late-antique South Arabian inscriptions as well as early Quran manuscripts. Holland wrote a response to Bowersock in the same publication, addressing and arguing against Bowersock's criticisms.

Ziauddin Sardar, writing for the New Statesman, said that the book seemed to be tailored to suit the rise in Islamophobic sentiments around the globe, and presented a grand narrative based on works of a "largely discredited group of orientalists", whose ample criticisms Holland seemed to be ignorant about. He finished his critique with "I find Holland’s total dismissal of Muslim scholarship arrogant (which I know he is not), insulting (which I know he does not mean to be) and based on spurious scholarship (though his scholarship is usually sound)."

Nebil Husayn, formerly of Princeton University, wrote a review of the book in the Journal of Shi'a Islamic Studies, in which he criticised it for "failing to incorporate recent methodological advancements in the field of Islamic history" and compared it to works of orientalist history.

== See also ==
- Islam: The Untold Story
