= Rubicon: The Last Years of the Roman Republic =

2003 book by Tom Holland

- First edition (UK)
- Author: Tom Holland
- Cover artist: Adolphe Yvon
- Language: English
- Subject: Ancient Rome
- Publisher: Little, Brown (UK)
- Publication date: 2003
- Publication place: United Kingdom
- Media type: Paperback
- Pages: 378
- ISBN: 978-1-4000-7897-4
- LC Class: DG266 .H64 2005

Rubicon: The Last Years of the Roman Republic, or Rubicon: The Triumph and Tragedy of the Roman Republic, is a popular history book written by Tom Holland, published in 2003.

The book tells the story of the end of the Roman Republic and the consequent establishment of the Roman Empire. The book takes its title from the river Rubicon in the northern Italian peninsula. In 49 BC, Julius Caesar crossed this river with his army and marched on Rome, breaking a sacred law of the Roman Republic and throwing the nation into a civil war.

== Reception ==
The book won the 2004 Hessell-Tiltman Prize. The Hessell-Tiltman prize is awarded annually for a non-fiction book of specifically historical content. Entrants are to be books of high literary merit – that is, not primarily written for the academic market – and can cover all historical periods. It was also shortlisted for the Samuel Johnson Prize for the same year.

The Observer described the book as "a modern, well-paced and finely observed history which entertains as it informs... That he makes a complicated historical period comprehensible is a tribute to broad research." A reviewer in the German Damals magazine wrote that while the book contributed nothing essentially new it was still an asset for bringing a whole era back to life in a sovereign and coherent manner. Rubicon has received favorable reviews from the Houston Chronicle, The Seattle Times, the Los Angeles Times, and others.
