= James Holland (author) =

British popular historian, writer and broadcaster (b. 1970)

James Holland FRHistS
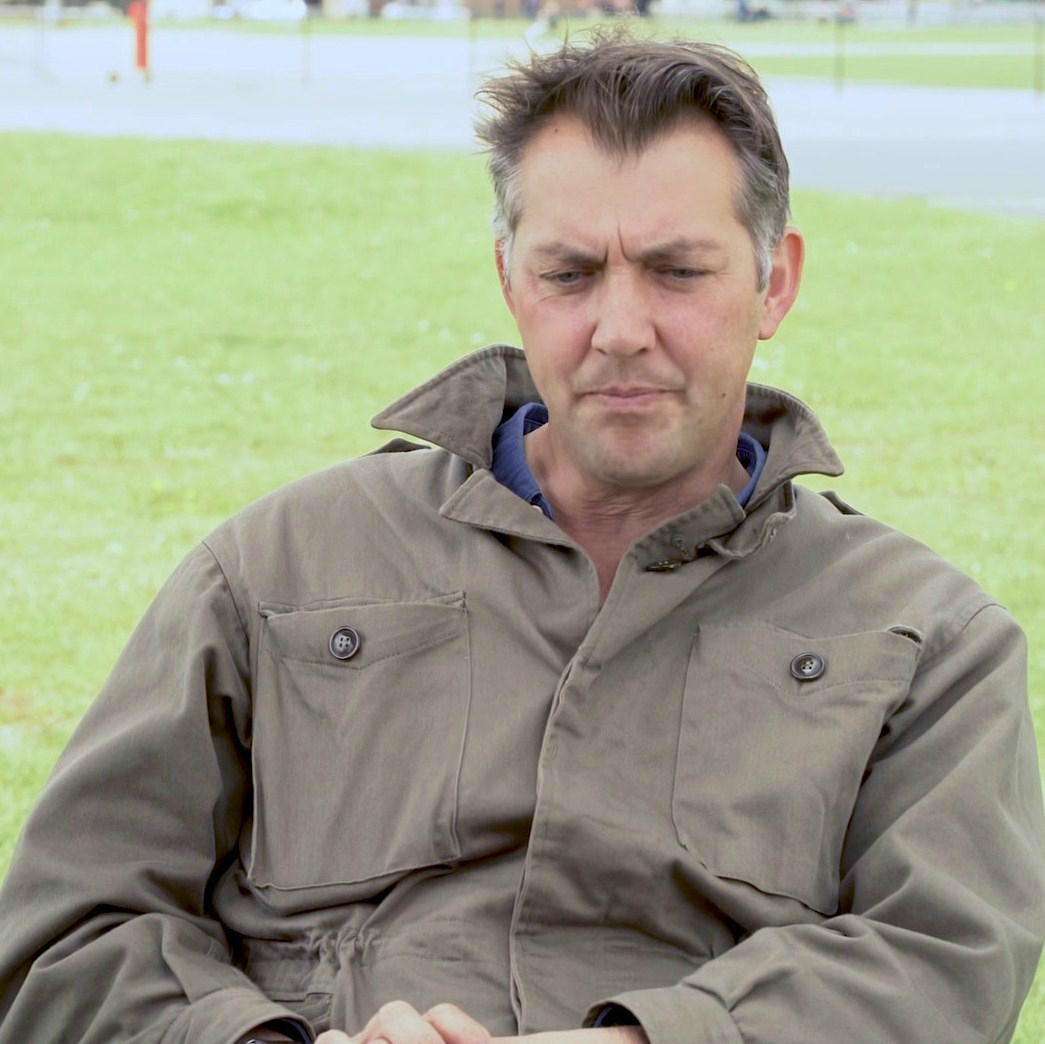
- Holland in 2017
- Born: 27 June 1970 (age 56); Salisbury, Wiltshire, England
- Education: St Chad's College, Durham (BA)
- Occupations: Historian; author; broadcaster
- Spouse: Rachel Holland
- Children: 2
- Relatives: Tom Holland (brother); Charles Holland (great-uncle)
- Writing career
- Language: English
- Subject: World War II
- Website: griffonmerlin.com

James Holland (born 27 June 1970) is an English popular historian, author and broadcaster, who specialises in the history of the Second World War.

Holland has written novels and non-fiction history books focusing on the Second World War, and presented documentaries for television and radio. He is the co-founder and co-chair of the annual Chalke Valley History Festival, and co-hosts the We Have Ways Of Making You Talk podcast with Al Murray.

On 20 August 2025, Holland was sanctioned by the Russian government as a response to UK sanctions on Russian companies and individuals in connection to the war in Ukraine.

== Early life and education ==
Holland was born in Salisbury, Wiltshire. He was educated at Chafyn Grove School, Salisbury, and King's School, Bruton, and in 1992 attained a BA degree in history from St Chad's College, Durham. His elder brother Tom Holland is a writer and historian.

== Career ==
Holland has written both novels and non-fiction history books focusing on the Second World War, and has presented documentary programming about WWII for television and radio. Before this he worked as a literary publicist.

He is the co-founder, co-chair and programme director of the annual Chalke History Festival (formally Chalke Valley History Festival), which is the largest festival dedicated entirely to history in the UK.

Holland and Al Murray are the hosts of the We Have Ways Of Making You Talk podcast.

=== Non-fiction books ===
Holland's first historical account of World War II was published in 2003. Fortress Malta – An Island Under Siege, 1940–1943 was favourably reviewed by Nicholas Roe for The Guardian: "Fortress Malta succeeds brilliantly in showing war's human position. James Holland deftly interweaves the personal histories of pilots, soldiers, submariners, sailors, nurses, office clerks and other civilians. All are brought compellingly to life in a brisk, tightly constructed narrative that has the impetus of first-hand experience."

In 2006, Holland published a study of a selection of young men who reached adulthood during World War II. Twenty-One: Coming of Age in the Second World War (retitled Heroes: The Greatest Generation and the Second World War for the 2007 paperback release) was reviewed by Max Hastings in The Telegraph: "Holland has already achieved a reputation as a fine and perceptive recorder of human experience. Here, he exploits his skills to describe what it is like for very young people to find themselves performing tasks and sometimes assuming responsibilities greater than anything they could have known at 21 in peacetime life."

His 2008 book Italy's Sorrow: A Year of War, 1944–1945 was reviewed by Publishers Weekly, which said: "This is popular history at its very best: exhaustively researched, compellingly written and authoritative".

Historian Saul David, writing in The Telegraph, praised Holland's book The Battle of Britain: Five Months that Changed History, May – October 1940 (2010): "Holland prefers his history to be about people, and his dazzling cast of characters includes civilians and servicemen, men and women, young and old. It may take him more than 300 pages to get to the Battle of Britain proper, yet the pace never flags".

Aviation History magazine called his 2013 history, Dam Busters: The True Story of the Inventors and Airmen Who Led the Devastating Raid to Smash the German Dams in 1943 "painstakingly researched and splendidly told" and said that it was "the definitive book on the subject, deserving a place in the library of any student of the famous raid".

In 2015, The Guardian reviewed the first volume in Holland's planned trilogy, The War in the West, Volume I: Germany Ascendant 1939–1941, with writer Alexander Larman calling it "impeccably researched and superbly written" and saying "Holland’s fascinating saga offers a mixture of captivating new research and well-considered revisionism. The next two volumes should be unmissable." The second volume, The War in the West:The Allies Strike Back, 1941–1943, was published in 2017 and was called by Kirkus Reviews "an expert, anecdote-filled, thoroughly entertaining if heavily British-oriented history of the war’s middle years".

His 2019 book Normandy '44: D-Day and the Battle for France was called "far from the first but among the better histories of the Allied invasion of Europe" by Kirkus Reviews and "an excellent and engrossing new look at the Normandy invasion" by Publishers Weekly.

Holland writes entries in the Ladybird Expert Series of books for children, with each focused on a particular battle or aspect of World War II. He has said that he plans to write a total of twelve books for the series. He is an occasional contributor to Britain at War magazine and with Al Murray guest edited the May 2024 issue.

=== Novels ===
Holland's first novel, The Burning Blue (2004), is about a young fighter pilot who is hiding a family secret. It takes place in the months leading up to and after the start of World War II. Nigel Jones wrote the Guardian review of it and said "[Holland] has joined the few who can bring history to life." A sequel, A Pair of Silver Wings (2006), followed; it is about another young fighter pilot's journey to Malta and beyond.

His first novel in a series featuring the exploits of Sgt. Jack Tanner, a soldier in the fictitious WWII unit The King's Own Yorkshire Rangers, was published in 2008. The Odin Mission was favorably reviewed by the Telegraph's Roger Perkins, who called it "a meaty, all-action yarn". As of 2019, a total of five Jack Tanner books have been published.

Holland has written two young adult novels about teenage soldiers taking part in famous World War II battles: Duty Calls: Dunkirk (2011) and Duty Calls: Battle of Britain (2012).

=== Documentaries ===
Holland has written and presented documentaries on World War II for BBC Two. Battle of Britain: The Real Story (2010) received a Break-through Talent nomination from the BAFTA TV Craft Awards for its producer/director Aaron Young. Dam Busters: The Race to Smash the German Dams aired in 2011, The Battle for Malta in 2013 and Normandy '44: The Battle Beyond D-Day in 2014.

With his two-part BBC Two documentary Cold War, Hot Jets (2013), he took a rare departure from World War II to focus on the postwar era and the aeronautics race. Reviewing it for the Guardian, Sam Wollaston called it a "rip-roaring documentary."

Starting in 2015, Holland filmed multiple episodes of the PBS documentary series Pritzker Military Presents, produced by the Pritzker Military Museum & Library in Chicago. Two of the episodes were based upon the first two volumes of his War in the West book trilogy: The Rise of Germany, 1939–1941 and The Allies Strike Back, 1941–1943, and a third was based upon his 2018 book Big Week: The Biggest Air Battle of World War II. He appeared on an episode of the National Geographic Channel's Nazi Megastructures, titled 'Hitler's Killer Subs', in 2016.

In 2018, he made a documentary for Dan Snow's on-demand history channel, HistoryHit TV. In Imphal & Kohima: Britain's Greatest Battle, he argued that the simultaneous 1944 Battle of Imphal and Battle of Kohima, in which Allied forces drove back the Japanese attempt to invade India, was Britain's greatest military battle of all time. In 2019, he looked at the use of amphetamines in World War II and how it unleashed the first pharmacological arms race in an episode of the PBS history series Secrets of the Dead, titled World War Speed.

Holland appeared as one of the team of experts investigating the theory that Adolf Hitler could have survived World War II and escaped to South America, in the History Channel series Hunting Hitler (2015–2018). He said of it: "I was certainly interested in learning more about how Nazis escaped, but was very careful never to mention on film that I thought either Hitler or Bormann escaped. Because they didn't."

In 2019 Holland appeared in the two-part BBC documentary series Lost home movies of Nazi Germany, where he was recorded reacting to personal footage captured in Germany and its occupied territories shortly before and during the Second World War.

== Personal life ==
Holland is honorary secretary and a playing member of Chalke Valley Cricket Club, and was instrumental in organising the relocation of the cricket ground from a combined football and cricket ground at the Chalke Valley Sports Centre to a new ground, solely for cricket, at Butt's Field in Bowerchalke, Wiltshire. He contributed a chapter about the creation of the new cricket ground to the book The Authors XI: A Season of English Cricket from Hackney to Hambledon, which was collectively written by members of another cricket team on which he has played, the Authors XI.

In August 2014, he was one of 200 public figures who were signatories to a letter to The Guardian expressing their hope that Scotland would vote to remain part of the United Kingdom in September's referendum on that issue.

He is a Fellow of the Royal Historical Society and a member of both the British Commission for Military History and the Guild of Battlefield Guides. He has his own collection at the Imperial War Museum.

He is the great-nephew of Olympian Charles Holland, the first British cyclist to complete the Tour de France.

Holland lives in rural Wiltshire with his wife Rachel and their son and daughter.

== Books ==
=== Non-fiction for adults ===
- Holland, James (2003). Fortress Malta: An Island Under Siege 1940–43. London: Orion. ISBN 978-0752852881.
- — (2005). Together We Stand: North Africa 1942–1943, Turning the Tide in the West. London: HarperCollins. ISBN 978-0007176465.
- — (2006). Twenty-One: Coming of Age in the Second World War (retitled 'Heroes: The Greatest Generation and the Second World War' for paperback release). London: HarperCollins. ISBN 978-0007213801.
- — (2008). Italy's Sorrow: a Year of War, 1944–1945. London: Harper Press. ISBN 978-0007176441.
- — (2010). The Battle of Britain: Five Months That Changed History, May–October, 1940. London: Bantam Press. ISBN 978-0552156103.
- — (2013). Dam Busters: The True Story of the Inventors and Airmen Who Led the Devastating Raid to Smash the German Dams in 1943. London: Grove Press. ISBN 978-0802121691.
- — (2016). Burma '44: The Battle That Turned Britain's War in the East. London: Bantam Press. ISBN 978-0593075852.
- — (2018). Big Week: The Biggest Air Battle of World War Two. London: Bantam Press. ISBN 978-0593077979.
- — (2018). Royal Air Force, The Official Story. London: Welbeck. ISBN 978-0233005263.
- — (2019). Normandy '44: D-Day and the Battle for France. London: Bantam Press. ISBN 978-1787631274.
- — (2020). Sicily '43: The First Assault on Fortress Europe. London: Bantam Press. ISBN 978-1787632943.
- — (2021). Brothers in Arms: One Legendary Tank Regiment's Bloody War from D-Day to VE-Day. London: Bantam Press. ISBN 978-1787633940. This follows the Sherwood Rangers, a British tank regiment, throughout multiple battles.
- — (2023). The Savage Storm: The Battle for Italy 1943. London: Bantam Press. ISBN 978-1787636682.
- — (2024). Cassino '44: The Brutal Battle for Rome. London: Bantam Press. ISBN 978-0857505538.

==== The War in the West ====
- — (2015). The War in the West - A New History, Volume 1: Germany Ascendant 1939–1941. London: Corgi. ISBN 978-0552169202.
- — (2017). The War in the West - A New History, Volume 2: The Allies Fight Back 1941–1943. London: Corgi. ISBN 978-0802125606.

==== Co-written with Al Murray ====
- —; Murray, Al (2025). Victory '45 - The End of the War in Eight Surrenders. London: Bantam Press. ISBN 9780857507952.

=== Non-fiction for children ===
==== Ladybird Expert series ====
- Holland, James (1 June 2017). The Battle of Britain. illus. Keith Burns. London: Penguin Books. ISBN 978-0-7181-8629-6.
- — (22 March 2018). Blitzkrieg. illus. Keith Burns. London: Penguin. ISBN 978-0-7181-8630-2.
- — (22 March 2018). The Battle of the Atlantic. illus. Keith Burns. London: Penguin. ISBN 978-0-7181-8631-9.
- — (12 July 2018). The Desert War. illus. Keith Burns. London: Penguin. ISBN 978-0-7181-8650-0.
- — (1 November 2018). The Eastern Front 1941–1943. illus. Keith Burns. London: Penguin. ISBN 978-0-7181-8651-7.
- — (26 December 2019). The Pacific War 1941–1943. illus. Keith Burns. London: Penguin. ISBN 978-0-7181-8652-4.
- — (26 November 2020). The Bomber War. illus. Keith Burns. London: Penguin. ISBN 978-0-7181-8653-1.
- — (1 April 2021). The War in Italy. illus. Keith Burns. London: Penguin. ISBN 978-0-7181-8654-8.

=== Novels for adults ===
- Holland, James (2004). The Burning Blue. London: William Heinemann. ISBN 978-0434010158.
- — (2006). A Pair of Silver Wings. London: William Heinemann. ISBN 9780434010141.
- — (2024). Alvesdon. London: Penguin. ISBN 9781787636705.

==== Jack Tanner series ====
- — (2008). The Odin Mission. London: Bantam Press. ISBN 978-0593058343.
- — (2009). Darkest Hour. London: Bantam Press. ISBN 978-0593058367.
- — (2010). Blood of Honour. London: Bantam Press. ISBN 978-0593058381.
- — (2011). Hellfire. London: Bantam Press. ISBN 978-0593058404.
- — (2013). Devil's Pact. London: Bantam Press. ISBN 9780593061794.

=== Novels for young adults ===
- Holland, James (2011). Duty Calls: Dunkirk. London: Puffin. ISBN 978-0141332192.
- — (2012). Duty Calls: Battle of Britain. London: Puffin. ISBN 978-0141332208.

== Television broadcasts ==
- The End of the War in Europe, Victory in Europe (UKTV History, May 2005)
- Battle of Britain: The Real Story (BBC Two, September 2010)
- Dam Busters (BBC Two, 8 November 2011)
- Battle for Malta (BBC Two, 7 January 2013)
- War Heroes of the Skies (National Geographic Channel, August 2013)
- Cold War, Hot Jets (BBC Two, 8 November 2013)
- Normandy '44: The Battle Beyond D-Day (BBC Two, 6 June 2014)
- Nazi Megastructures – Episode: Hitler's Killer Subs (National Geographic, 2016)
- Hunting Hitler (History, 2015–2018)
- Pritzker Military Presents – Episode: 'The War in the West: The Rise of Germany, 1939 – 1941 (PBS, 2015)
- Pritzker Military Presents – Episode: The War in the West: The Allies Strike Back, 1941–1943 (PBS, 2017)
- Pritzker Military Presents – Episode: Big Week: The Biggest Air Battle of World War II (PBS, 2018)
- Imphal & Kohima: Britain's Greatest Battle (History Hit TV, 2018)
- Hitler's Circle of Evil – 5 Episodes (ZDF, 2018)
- Secrets of the Dead – Episode: World War Speed (Netflix, 2019)
- Greatest Events of WW2 in Color – Historian
- Hitler's Megafortresses (2019) ... Historian
- Hitler's Flying Forces (2019) ... Historian
- Hitler's Deadly Tanks (2019) ... Historian
- Hitler's War at Sea (2019) ... Historian
- Hitler's Henchmen (2019) ... Historian
- Battle for the Pacific (2019) ... Historian
- War on the Eastern Front (2019) ... Historian
- Nazi War Machines - secrets uncovered (2020)
  - The Luftwaffe
  - The Panzers
  - The U-boats
  - The Guns
- Normandy '44: D-Day and the Battle for France (2020) ... Historian
