= Escape Route (disambiguation) =

Escape Route or Escape Routes may refer to:

- Escape Route (film), a 1952 British film
- "Escape Route", a 1982 song composed for First Blood
- Escape Routes, a 1997 book by David Roberts (climber)
- "Escape Route", a 1998 short story by Peter F. Hamilton
- Escape Route, a 2009 album by Joe Budden
- Escape Routes (TV series), a 2012 American television series
- "Escape Route" (song), a 2013 song by Paramore
- Escape Routes, a 2016 book by Johann Christoph Arnold
- Escape Routes (book), a 2020 book by Naomi Ishiguro

== See also ==
- Emergency exit
- Evacuation route
- Runaway truck ramp
- Underground Railroad
- Prisoner of war
