= Climate change (disambiguation) =

Climate change includes both global warming driven by human-induced emissions of greenhouse gases and the resulting large-scale shifts in weather patterns.

Climate change may also refer to:

- Climate variability and change, changes in Earth's climate system resulting in new weather patterns that remain in place for an extended period of time
- Climate Change (album), a 2017 album by Pitbull
- Climate Change: Global Risks, Challenges and Decisions, a 2009 conference in Copenhagen
- Climate Change – The Facts, a 2019 British documentary presented by David Attenborough
- Climate Change TV, an online broadcaster
- Climate Change: What Everyone Needs to Know, a 2015 book by Joe Romm
- Climate Change (Ladybird Expert book), a 2017 book for adults co-authored by Charles III
- Climate Change (children's book), a 2023 book co-authored by Charles III

== See also ==
- Global warming (disambiguation)
