= Climatize =

Climatize can refer to:

- Air conditioning, the process of mechanically removing heat from the air
- Acclimatisation, the process of organisms adjusting to changes in the physical environment

== See also ==
- Climate (disambiguation)
