= Climate Change (children's book) =

2023 children's book by Charles III, Tony Juniper, and Emily Shuckburgh

- Front cover, 2023
- Author: Charles III, Tony Juniper, and Emily Shuckburgh
- Illustrator: Aleesha Nandhra
- Language: English
- Genre: Children's non-fiction literature
- Publisher: Ladybird Books
- Publication date: 9 March 2023
- Publication place: United Kingdom
- Media type: Print (hardcover)
- Pages: 48
- ISBN: 9780241545669

Climate Change is a children's book co-authored by Charles III, the King of the United Kingdom and the 14 other Commonwealth realms, Tony Juniper, the Chair of Natural England, and climate scientist Emily Shuckburgh. The book was published by Ladybird Books on 9 March 2023. Aimed at those aged between seven and eleven, it discusses climate change and the various threats that face the environment. The book was launched at a reception held at Buckingham Palace on 17 February 2023, and attended by politicians, businesspeople and indigenous leaders from around the world.

Charles had previously collaborated with Juniper and Shuckburgh on a book for adults, also titled Climate Change, and published by Ladybird in 2017. The information was updated and rewritten for the 2023 version to make it accessible to children. Juniper has described Climate Change as a way of "trying to bring the facts to the fingertips of the people who've got most to gain by finding solutions in time".
