= Ladybird Expert =

Non-fiction book series

- Cover images from series
- Country: United Kingdom
- Language: English
- Publisher: Ladybird Books
- Published: 2017–present
- Media type: Hardback
- Preceded by: Ladybird for Grown Ups

The Ladybird Expert books (series 117) is a series of titles for an adult readership intended to provide clear, accessible and authoritative introductions, informed by expert opinion, to key subjects drawn from science, history and culture.

The books, which feature the first new classic Ladybird artworks for 40 years, have a "50/50" split between text and illustration with the latter ranging from literal interpretations of the complex subjects, to more surreal, abstract representations.

== History ==
Penguin Books revived the Ladybird Books brand, which had achieved iconic status publishing 646 classic pocket-sized mini-hardback children's books between the 1940s and the 1980s, in 2015 with a series of spoof books called Ladybird for Grown Ups, which paired classic illustrations with new text written by TV comedy writers Jason Hazeley and Joel Morris to great commercial success.

Penguin's Publishing Director Rowland White has stated that following this success, they were already thinking about a new series of factual books for adults by experts on science, history and arts subjects, when they were contacted by the staff of Charles, Prince of Wales suggesting a book on climate change in the traditional Ladybird style.

Responding to questions about the choice of the title Ladybird Experts at a time of increased anti-intellectualism, White stated:

I am of the view expertise is a good thing and, I suppose, we weren't unaware of the way in which the term 'expert' has become almost a prerogative term in some quarters over the last year or so. I wouldn't go so far as to say we were trying to reclaim the world expert, but our view is expertise in a subject is a good thing and if you want to gain a greater understanding of something then your best course of action is to try and learn from an expert rather than from a Google search.

The project, which was led by Penguin's Creative Director of Brands and Licensing Ronnie Fairweather, resulted in a new series of books, featuring the first new Ladybird style illustrations in 40 years, which began in January 2017 with the publication of the first three titles.

== Selected titles ==
=== Climate Change ===
Climate Change
- Author: Charles, Prince of Wales, Tony Juniper and Emily Shuckburgh
- Illustrator: Ruth Palmer
- Language: English
- Series: Ladybird Expert
- Subject: Climate change
- Publisher: Ladybird Books
- Publication date: 26 January 2017
- Publication place: United Kingdom
- Media type: Print
- ISBN: 0718185854

Climate Change is a 2017 study guide to climate change written by Charles, Prince of Wales, Tony Juniper and Emily Shuckburgh, and illustrated by Ruth Palmer. The volume, according to the publisher's website, explains the history, dangers and challenges of global warming and explores possible solutions with which to reduce its impact. The book was listed at number three in The Sunday Times bestseller list upon release.

The idea for the book came from Charles' friend Nicholas Soames, who, following the Prince's address on to world leaders at the opening session of the 2015 United Nations Climate Change Conference in Paris, pointed out the need for a guide to the subject in plain English.

Charles contacted environmental campaigner and writer Tony Juniper, who had been a special adviser to the Prince of Wales Charities' International Sustainability Unit and the Prince's Rainforests Project, whose wife suggested the Ladybird Book format for the project.

Juniper and Shuckburg, who are both based in Cambridge and work for the Cambridge Institute for Sustainability Leadership, of which Charles is the patron, spent nine months working on the project. Juniper credits his own career choice to the Ladybird Nature series books he read as a child.

At the insistence of the authors, the draft was submitted to the Royal Meteorological Society for peer review under the editorship of the chairman of its climate science special interest group David Warrilow. The Guardian's associate culture editor Claire Armitstead dismisses this as comic pomposity that could pass for a spoof itself. The review board amended some of the more assertive language, according to Rowland White, and the society also hosts an online annex to the book containing an updated list of references at https://www.rmets.org/ladybird-annex/.

Concerns that Charles, who as heir apparent to the British throne should maintain political neutrality, writing a book about a potentially sensitive issue could be controversial proved largely unfounded. Some politicians expressed criticism, including Peter Lilley, of the Conservative Party, who stated that Charles was reflecting the view that climate change denial was outside the bounds of acceptable behaviour, while other politicians offered commendation, including Nicholas Soames of the Conservative Party, who had first suggested the project, and Vince Cable, of the Liberal Democrats, who saw no problem with Charles writing about a subject that had public and scientific consensus.

The timing of the release, which coincided with the inauguration of Donald Trump as US President was seen by Tom Batchelor, writing for The Independent as provocative. Juniper has stated that he hopes a copy of the book ends up in the hands of Trump so that he has a chance to review his views on the topic.

Ravensbourne University London's dean of design Prof. Lawrence Zeegen states that the use of the aesthetics of the 1950s and '60s to draw attention to an urgent 21st-century issue results in what appears to be an endorsement of the reactionary views on society commonly attributed to Charles.

Artwork from the book was included in the first exhibition in The Ladybird Gallery at the Museum of English Rural Life, of which Charles is a patron, which ran from March 11 to July 2, 2017.

=== Quantum Mechanics ===
Quantum Mechanics
- Author: Jim Al-Khalili
- Illustrator: Jeff Cummins and Dan Newman
- Language: English
- Series: Ladybird Expert
- Subject: Quantum mechanics
- Publisher: Ladybird Books
- Publication date: 26 January 2017
- Publication place: United Kingdom
- Media type: Print
- ISBN: 0718186273

Quantum Mechanics is a 2017 study guide to quantum mechanics written by Jim Al-Khalili and illustrated by Jeff Cummins and Dan Newman. The volume, according to the publisher's website, explores all the key players, breakthroughs, controversies and unanswered questions of the quantum world. The book was listed at number five in the Sunday Times bestseller list upon release.

Al-Khalili, who was first introduced to Ladybird books by his British mother during his childhood in Iraq, compared his subject with the others in the new series, stating:

It's clearly not the same as climate change, I am not on a moral crusade. But I would say quantum mechanics is on a par with evolution. We wouldn't have health and medicine and agriculture without understanding Darwin's theory of evolution. Similarly I wouldn't be talking to you on my mobile phone without quantum mechanics.

Commenting on the difficulty of producing a summary of the world's most complicated science in 50 heavily illustrated pages, Jim Al-Khalili stated:

Readers of the book will most certainly not come away understanding quantum mechanics – even I am confused by it and I have dedicated the past 30 years of my life to the subject – but they will at least know why it's confusing and will have some great dinner-party facts to sound clever with.

Illustrator Jeff Cummins described the process of working on the book as "very collaborative" and added that "[he] enjoyed the experience liaising with the author and the creative director, figuring out how to illustrate quantum theories and generally trying to get [his] head around quantum mechanics".

The Guardian's associate culture editor Claire Armitstead points to the full-page illustration of a joke about the sponsorship of Denmark's Niels Bohr Institute by a well-known lager brewer as an example of the series' sly tongue-in-cheek humour.

British journalist and critic John Crace published a pastiche of the book in his "Digested Read" column for The Guardian.

=== Evolution ===
Evolution is a 2017 study guide to evolution written by Steve Jones and illustrated by Rowan Clifford. The volume, according to the publisher's website, explores the extraordinary diversity of life on our planet through the complex interactions of one very simple theory, and, according to its author, goes from foxes to human frailty.

Jones has stated creationists, including the then US Vice President Mike Pence do not know what Charles Darwin's ideas actually were and that his intention in the book is to reveal the bare bones of this theory.

Jones, who has stated that Ladybird books were not a feature of his childhood in Welsh speaking Aberystwyth, says that he is using the book, which is for both schoolchildren and grown-ups, as the textbook for his first-year evolution course at University College London.

The Guardian's associate culture editor Claire Armitstead points to the final picture of the book's Guardian-reading author being hoisted aloft by an extremely well-endowed chimp as and example of the series' sly tongue-in-cheek humour.

== List of titles ==
#	Title	Writer(s)	Illustrator(s)	Publication Date	ISBN
1	Climate Change	Charles, Prince of Wales, Tony Juniper and Emily Shuckburgh	Ruth Palmer	26 January 2017	978-0-7181-8585-5
2	Quantum Mechanics	Jim Al-Khalili	Jeff Cummins and Dan Newman	26 January 2017	978-0-7181-8627-2
3	Evolution	Steve Jones	Rowan Clifford	26 January 2017	978-0-7181-8628-9
4	Plate Tectonics	Iain Stewart	Ruth Palmer	22 March 2018	978-0-7181-8718-7
5	Exoplanets	Maggie Aderin-Pocock		TBA	978-0-7181-8726-2
6	Shackleton	Ben Saunders	Rowan Clifford	1 June 2017	978-0-7181-8727-9
7	The Battle of Britain	James Holland	Keith Burns	1 June 2017	978-0-7181-8629-6
8	Blitzkrieg	James Holland	Keith Burns	22 March 2018	978-0-7181-8630-2
9	Battle of the Atlantic	James Holland	Keith Burns	22 March 2018	978-0-7181-8631-9
10	Desert War	James Holland	Keith Burns	12 July 2018	978-0-7181-8650-0
11	The Eastern Front 1941-43	James Holland	Keith Burns	1 November 2018	978-0-7181-8651-7
12	The Pacific War 1941-43	James Holland	Keith Burns	26 December 2019	978-0-7181-8652-4
13	The Bomber War	James Holland	Keith Burns	26 November 2020	978-0-7181-8653-1
14	The War in Italy	James Holland	Keith Burns	1 April 2021	978-0-7181-8654-8
20	Twentieth-Century Classical Music	Fiona Maddocks	Jeff Cummins	12 July 2018	978-0-7181-8786-6
21	Æthelflæd: England's Forgotten Founder	Tom Holland	Colin Shearing	7 February 2019	978-0-7181-8826-9
23	Genetics	Adam Rutherford	Ruth Palmer	14 June 2018	978-0-7181-8827-6
24	Bubbles	Helen Czerski	Chris Moore	1 November 2018	978-0-7181-8829-0
25	Timbuktu	Gus Casely-Hayford	Angelo Rinaldi	22 March 2018	978-0-7181-8910-5
26	Beowulf	Janina Ramirez	Martyn Pick	5 September 2019	978-0-7181-8973-0
27	Artificial Intelligence	Michael Wooldridge	Stephen Player	22 March 2018	978-0-7181-8875-7
28	Battle of Trafalgar	Sam Willis	Paul Young	27 June 2019	978-0-7181-8873-3
29	Consciousness	Hannah Critchlow	Stephen Player	14 June 2018	978-0-7181-8911-2
30	The Spanish Armada	Sam Willis	Paul Young	14 June 2018	978-0-7181-8857-3
31	Nuclear Deterrence	Lawrence Freedman	Duncan Smith	4 October 2018	978-0-7181-8889-4
32	Octopuses	Helen Scales	Alan Male	21 March 2019	978-0-7181-8909-9
33	Armageddon	Joann Fletcher		TBA	978-0-7181-8883-2
34	Plato's Republic	Angie Hobbs	Angelo Rinaldi	7 February 2019	978-0-7181-8852-8
35	The Battle of The Nile	Sam Willis	Paul Young	7 February 2019	978-0-7181-8858-0
36	Witchcraft	Suzannah Lipscomb	Martyn Pick	4 October 2018	978-0-7181-8843-6
37	Human Origins	Alice Roberts		TBA	978-0-7181-8813-9
38	Homer	Daisy Dunn	Angelo Rinaldi	5 September 2019	978-0-7181-8828-3
39	Pain	Irene Tracey	Stephen Player	26 November 2020	978-0-241-34553-5
	Big Bang	Marcus Chown	Chris Moore	22 March 2018	978-0-7181-8784-2
	Gravity	Jim Al-Khalili	Jeff Cummins	7 February 2019	978-0-7181-8903-7

== Reception ==
Mr B's Emporium of Reading Delights' founder Nic Bottomley stated that the books in this series were very different from previous retro-books for adults and that they looked like great access points to complex subjects from some brilliant writers.

Ravensbourne University London's dean of design Prof. Lawrence Zeegen criticized the quality of the illustrations, stating that while a reasonable attempt at replicating the originals, they were not as good as those that were produced for the original series by artists working in an idiom that was, at the time, modern. He concludes that the use of the no longer contemporary style feels patronizing in a way the original books never did.
