= Richard Overy =

British historian (born 1947)

Professor Richard Overy FRHistS FBA
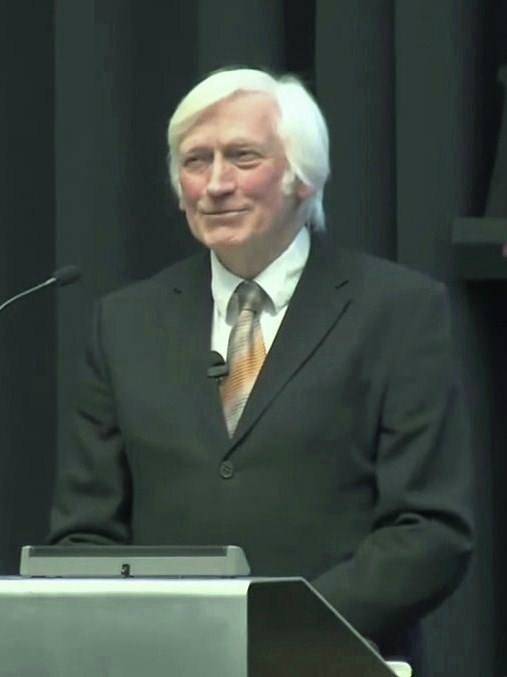
- Overy lecturing at King's College London in 2015
- Born: Richard James Overy; 23 December 1947 (age 78)
- Education: Gonville and Caius College, Cambridge
- Occupation: Historian
- Employer: University of Exeter
- Known for: Studies on military history, especially the Second World War
- Notable credit(s): Why the Allies Won, The Air War: 1939–1945

Richard James Overy FRHistS FBA (born 23 December 1947) is a British historian who has published on the history of World War II and Nazi Germany.

== Life and career ==
Overy, after being educated at Gonville and Caius College, Cambridge, and becoming a research fellow at Churchill College, taught history at Cambridge from 1972 to 1979, as a fellow of Queens' College and from 1976 as a university assistant lecturer. He moved to King's College London, where he became professor of modern history in 1994. He was appointed to a professorship at the University of Exeter in 2004.

In 2007, as The Times editor of Complete History of the World, he chose the 50 key dates of world history.

In 2021, Overy helped to curate objects for displays in the Imperial War Museum's Second World War galleries. Some of these objects included flight goggles and a leather helmet once used by Billy Strachan.

=== Dispute with Timothy Mason ===
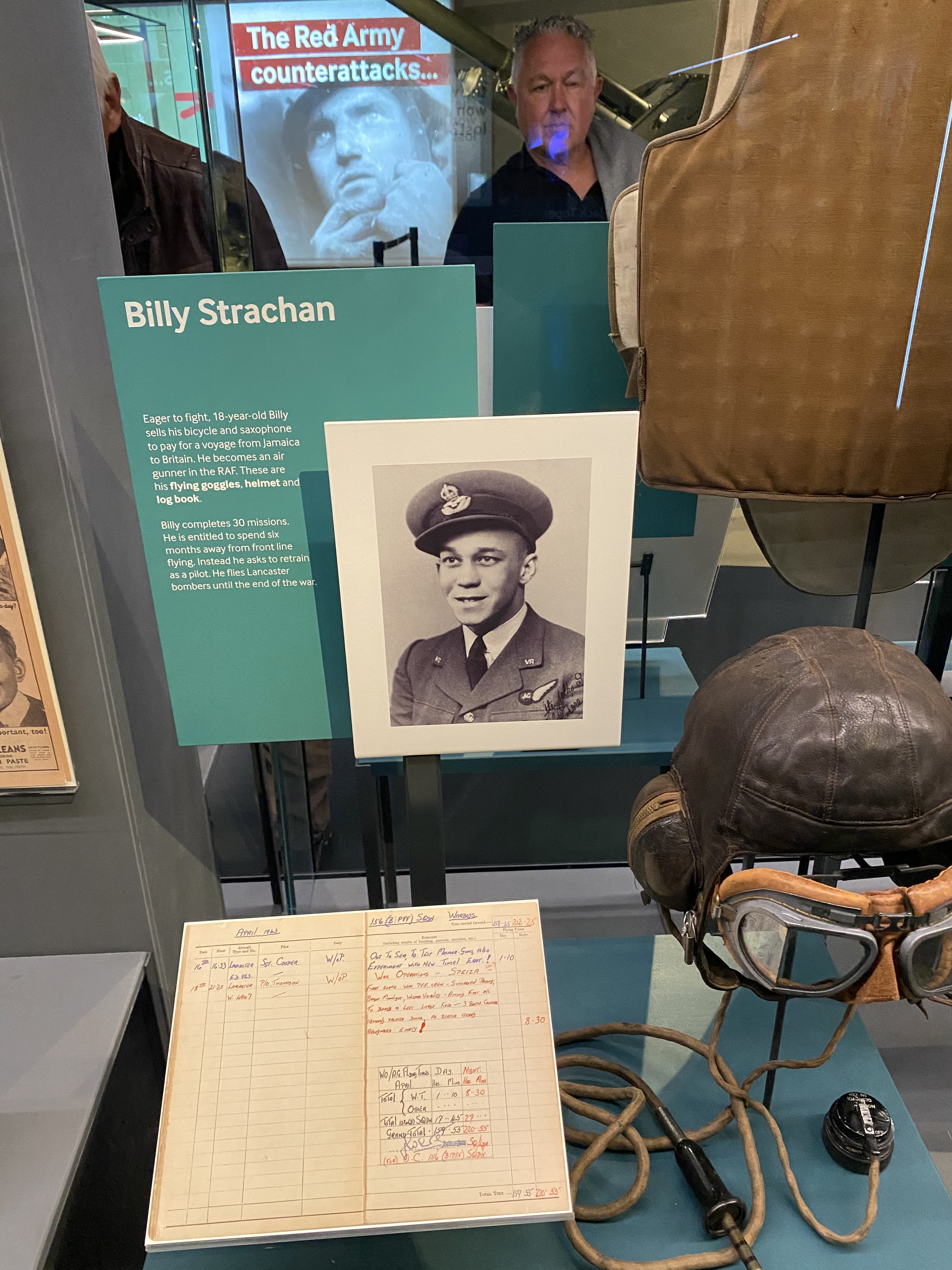
A museum display created by Overy in the Imperial War Museum featuring objects once belonging to Billy Strachan.

In the late 1980s, Overy was involved in a historical dispute with Timothy Mason that mostly played out on the pages of Past & Present over the reasons for the outbreak of the Second World War in 1939. Mason had contended that a "flight into war" had been imposed on Adolf Hitler by a structural economic crisis, which confronted Hitler with the choice of making difficult economic decisions or aggression. Overy argued against Mason's thesis by maintaining that though Germany was faced with economic problems in 1939, their extent cannot explain aggression against Poland and the outbreak of war was caused by the Nazi leadership. For Overy, the problem with Mason's thesis was that it rested on assumptions that were not shown by records, information that was passed on to Hitler about Germany's economic problems.

Overy argued that there was a difference between economic pressures induced by the problems of the Four Year Plan and economic motives to seize raw materials, industry and foreign reserves of neighbouring states as a way of accelerating the Four Year Plan. Overy asserted that the repressive capacity of the German state as a way of dealing with domestic unhappiness was somewhat downplayed by Mason. Finally, Overy argued that there is considerable evidence that Germany felt that it could master the economic problems of rearmament; as one civil servant put it in January 1940, "we have already mastered so many difficulties in the past, that here too, if one or other raw material became extremely scarce, ways and means will always yet be found to get out of a fix".

== Awards and honours ==
- 1977: Fellow of the Royal Historical Society
- 2000: Fellow of the British Academy
- 2003: Fellow of King's College
- 2001: Samuel Eliot Morison Prize of the Society for Military History
- 2005: Wolfson History Prize, The Dictators: Hitler's Germany; Stalin's Russia
- 2005: Hessell-Tiltman Prize, The Dictators: Hitler's Germany, Stalin's Russia

== In media ==
- Overy was featured in the 2003 ITV documentary Breaking the Silence: Truth and Lies in the War on Terror.
- Overy was featured in the 2006 BBC docudrama Nuremberg: Nazis on Trial.
- KGNU's Claudia Cragg – interview with Overy on "Countdown To War" for Remembrance Day (Veteran's Day) 2010.
- Overy was a featured commentator in the 2018 series Hitler's Circle of Evil.
- Overy appeared in all four series of Rise of the Nazis, covering the subject of Hermann Goring.

== Publications ==
- William Morris, Viscount Nuffield (1976), ISBN 0-900362-84-7.
- The Air War: 1939–1945 (1980), ISBN 1-57488-716-5.
- The Nazi Economic Recovery, 1932–1938 (1982), ISBN 0-521-55286-9.
- Goering: The "Iron Man" (1984), ISBN 1-84212-048-4.
- All Our Working Lives (with Peter Pagnamenta, 1984), ISBN 0-563-20117-7.
- The Origins of The Second World War, edited by Patrick Finney, London: Edward Arnold, Hodder Education Publishers (1997), Third Edition (2008) ISBN 0-340-67640-X.
- Co-written with Timothy Mason: "Debate: Germany, 'Domestic Crisis' and War in 1939", pp. 200–240 in Past and Present, Number 122, February 1989; reprinted as "Debate: Germany, 'Domestic Crisis' and the War in 1939" in The Origins of The Second World War (1997).
- The Road to War (with Andrew Wheatcroft, 1989), ISBN 0-14-028530-X.
- The Inter-War Crisis, 1919–1939 (1994), ISBN 0-582-35379-3.
- War and Economy in the Third Reich (1994), ISBN 0-19-820290-3.
- Why the Allies Won (1995), ISBN 0-224-04172-X.
- The Penguin Historical Atlas of the Third Reich (1996), ISBN 0-14-051330-2.
- The Times Atlas of the Twentieth Century (ed., 1996), ISBN 0-7230-0766-7.
- Bomber Command, 1939–45 (1997), ISBN 0-00-472014-8.
- Russia's War: Blood upon the Snow (1997), ISBN 1-57500-051-2. There was a companion 10-part television documentary series.
- The Times History of the 20th Century (1999), ISBN 0-00-716637-0.
- The Battle (2000), ISBN 0-14-029419-8 (republished as The Battle of Britain: The Myth and the Reality).
- Interrogations: The Nazi Elite in Allied Hands, 1945 (2001), ISBN 0-7139-9350-2 (republished as Interrogations: Inside the Minds of the Nazi Elite).
- Germany: A New Social and Economic History. Vol. 3: Since 1800 (ed. with Sheilagh Ogilvie, 2003), ISBN 0-340-65215-2.
- The Times Complete History of the World (6th ed., 2004), ISBN 0-00-718129-9.
- The Dictators: Hitler's Germany and Stalin's Russia (2004), ISBN 0-7139-9309-X.
- Collins Atlas of Twentieth Century History (2005), ISBN 0-00-720170-2.
- Imperial War Museum's Second World War Experience Volume 1: Blitzkrieg (2008), ISBN 978-1-84442-014-8.
- Imperial War Museum's Second World War Experience Volume 2: Axis Ascendant (2008), ISBN 978-1-84442-008-7.
- 1939: Countdown to War (2009), ISBN 978-960-16-3467-8.
- The Morbid Age: Britain Between the Wars (2009), ISBN 978-0-7139-9563-3.
- The Bombing War: Europe 1939–1945 (2013), ISBN 0713995610 (later published as The Bombers and the Bombed: Allied Air War Over Europe, 1940–1945, ISBN 978-0-670-02515-2).
- A History of War in 100 Battles (2014), ISBN 9780007452507.
- RAF: The Birth of the World's First Air Force (2018), ISBN 978-0-393-35724-0
- Blood and Ruins: The Great Imperial War, 1931–1945 (2021), ISBN 978-0-713-99562-6
- Why War? (2024), ISBN 978-1-324-02174-2
- Rain of Ruin: Tokyo, Hiroshima, and the Surrender of Japan (2025), ISBN 978-1-324-10530-5
