= The Allies Strike Back =

2017 book

The Allies Strike Back, 1941-1943
- Author: James Holland
- Language: English
- Series: The War in the West
- Release number: 2
- Subject: Military history
- Genre: Nonfiction
- Publisher: Atlantic Monthly Press
- Publication date: 2017
- Publication place: United States of America
- Pages: 752
- ISBN: 978-0802125606
- Preceded by: The Rise of Germany, 1939–1941

The Allies Strike Back, 1941-1943 is a 2017 nonfiction military history book by James Holland. It was published by Atlantic Monthly Press. It is the second book in his The War in the West series, after The Rise of Germany, 1939–1941 (2015).

== Overview ==
The book covers World War II, focusing on events like the Nazi invasion of the Soviet Union, the North African campaign, and the entry of the United States into the conflict.

== Reception ==
Publishers Weekly gave the book a positive review, writing that it "shifts smoothly between high-level strategy and tactical battlefield events". Col. Eric M. Walters praised the book in the Military Review, writing that it was thoroughly researched and accessibly written.

Frederic Krome, in a review for Library Journal, recommended it as a primer to the Second World War, highlighting its technical depth.

Kirkus Reviews noted that the book was "heavily British-oriented" but gave it an overall positive review. Jerry D. Lenaburg, in a review for the New York Journal of Books, also noted the book's "Anglo-centric flair".

== Similar or related works ==
- Allies at War by Tim Bouverie (2025)
- The Second World War by Antony Beevor (2012).
- Inferno: The World at War, 1939-1945 by Max Hastings (2011).
- The Storm of War by Andrew Roberts (2009).
