= Climate (disambiguation) =

Climate is the long-term weather pattern in a region.

Climate or Climates may also refer to:

- Climate, an interchangeable part of an astrolabe, an ancient astronomical instrument
- "Climate" (song), by BigXthaPlug and Offset
- Climates (band), a British melodic hardcore band
- Climates (film), a 2006 Turkish drama

== See also ==
- Climate change (disambiguation)
- Clime, a divisions of the earth by latitude in classical Greco-Roman geography and astronomy
- Organisation climate
- Political climate
