= The Rise of Germany =

2015 book

The Rise of Germany, 1939–1941
- Author: James Holland
- Language: English
- Series: The War in the West
- Release number: 1
- Subject: Military history
- Genre: Nonfiction
- Publisher: Atlantic Monthly Press
- Publication date: 2015
- Publication place: United States of America
- Pages: 656
- ISBN: 978-0-8021-2397-8
- Followed by: The Allies Strike Back, 1941-1943 (2017)

The Rise of Germany, 1939–1941 is a 2015 nonfiction military history book by James Holland. It was published by Atlantic Monthly Press. It is the first book in his The War in the West series, preceding The Allies Strike Back, 1941-1943 (2017). The book was published by Penguin Classics as The War in the West - A New History: Volume 1: Germany Ascendant 1939-1941.

== Overview ==
The book explains the initial success of Nazi Germany in its occupation of Europe as a result of strategic mistakes on the part of the Allied Nations, rather than an unstoppable Blitzkrieg driven by German technological and military superiority.

== Reception ==
Stephen Bourque of H-Net praised the book's enjoyable writing style and revisionist analysis of well-known historical materials into a new narrative of the beginning of World War II. Frederic Krome of Library Journal praised its writing style and informativeness, while noting that at the time of its publication other authors had already approached the war from a similar revisionist viewpoint and reached similar conclusions.

Steve Donoghue, writing for Open Letters Monthly, gave the book a positive review for debunking commonly held misconceptions about the military, economic and political conditions that shaped World War II. Publishers Weekly wrote that "Holland nimbly weaves the complex military, diplomatic, political, economic, and social patterns that marked the conflict on a global scale." Kirkus Reviews gave the book an overall positive review, noting that it incorporated the lives and perspectives of historical figures like Galeazzo Ciano, André Beaufre, and Edward Spears to add intimacy to its overarching narrative of international war and diplomacy.
