= Cambridge Zero =

UK Climate Change institute

- Formation: 2019; 7 years ago
- Purpose: Combating climate change
- Location: Cambridge, United Kingdom
- Leader: Emily Shuckburgh
- Website: www.zero.cam.ac.uk

Cambridge Zero is the University of Cambridge's response to climate change. Led by Dr. Emily Shuckburgh, a climate scientist, mathematician and science communicator, it is an interdisciplinary and collaborative initiative created "to harness the full range of the University’s research and policy expertise, developing solutions that work for our lives, our society and our economy".

== Overview ==
Shuckburgh stresses that Cambridge Zero will not work in isolation and that the climate crisis demands a holistic response: "There is a really urgent need for, frankly, an immediate response on a scale that is utterly unprecedented and does require the whole of our economy and the whole of society. It's about all of us contributing in the way we live our lives".

Cambridge Zero was first announced by Cambridge Vice-Chancellor Stephen Toope in his annual address in October 2019.

Electric flight is one of several engineering areas covered but Shuckburgh emphasizes the need for the broadest range of skills to support Cambridge Zero's output. She says, “I started being involved in climate-related research right at the start of it becoming an international political topic, and it’s been a convergence of different interests.”

Cambridge Zero represents the University of Cambridge in the COP26 Universities Network and is a facilitator of COP26's "Visions for a Net Zero Future" initiative.

== Criticism ==
Prior to the launch, student activists at Cambridge accused the university of attempting to greenwash its relationship with oil and gas firms by stealing their group’s name.
