= Naomi Ishiguro =

British author

- Born: 1992 (age 33–34); London, United Kingdom
- Education: University College London; University of East Anglia
- Occupation: Author
- Father: Kazuo Ishiguro
- Relatives: Shizuo Ishiguro (grandfather)

Naomi Ishiguro (born 1992) is a British author. She has published three books: a short story collection Escape Routes (2020) and her debut novel Common Ground (2021), and the first book in The Rainshadow Series, The Rainshadow Orphans (2026).

== Early life and education ==
Ishiguro was born in 1992 and grew up in Golders Green, North London, the daughter of Japanese-British Nobel-prize writer Kazuo Ishiguro. Her mother Lorna is a Scottish social worker from Glasgow.

Ishiguro attended South Hampstead High School and then Westminster School for sixth form. Before pursuing writing, she wanted to be an actress. She studied English at University College London, and later graduated with a master's degree in creative writing from the University of East Anglia.

Prior to her career as an author, Ishiguro worked as a bookseller and bibliotherapist at Mr. B's Emporium in Bath.

== Career ==
=== Escape Routes (2020) ===
Ishiguro's debut short story collection, Escape Routes, was published in 2020 by Tinder Press. The book consists of eight short stories and a novella.

It was reviewed positively by The Times, describing the stories as "winsomely written and engagingly quirky". However, the novella "The Rat Catcher", while starting strong, was criticised as being "overextended".

=== Common Ground (2021) ===
The following year, Ishiguro's debut novel, Common Ground, was published by Tinder Press. The story follows a cross-cultural friendship between two teenage boys: Stan, who is struggling with bullying; and Charlie, a Romany boy. The first half of the novel takes place in a fictional Surrey town in 2003, when the boys first become friends. Nine years pass, and the remainder of the book follows Stan and Charlie as adults in London.

The project came out of the "shock, fear and grief" Ishiguro felt following the EU referendum, and her frustrations around the lack of publicly-owned land in England. It was also inspired by her time living in Bath, including an encounter with a man with a broken bike by a canal, and the buskers she befriended at open-mic nights.

The novel was recommended by the New Statesman, calling it a "generous and disarming tale ... just the right side of sentimental" and Emma Lee-Potter of The Independent described the story as "thought-provoking and beautifully observed". It was named as one of Grazia's best books of 2021. Following the release of the novel, the Southbank Centre hosted an evening in conversation with Ishiguro and her father, Kazuo Ishiguro.

=== The Rainshadow Orphans (upcoming, 2026) ===
Her next novel, The Rainshadow Orphans, is to be published in 2026 by Simon & Schuster. It is the first book in a fantasy trilogy, inspired by Japanese folklore.

== Personal life ==
As of 2022, Ishiguro lives in Belsize Park.

== Works ==
=== Novels ===
- Common Ground (2021)
- The Rainshadow Orphans (upcoming, 2026)

=== Short fiction ===
- Escape Routes (2020)
- "A Proper Couple" (2020)
- "The Estate Agent" (Banshee Press, 2021)
- "Why can't we see him?" (Writers Mosaic)
