= Hitler's Circle of Evil =

2018 documentary television series

- Country of origin: United Kingdom

Original release
- Release: 2018

Hitler's Circle of Evil is a British historical documentary television series.

== Cast ==
=== Historians ===
- Guy Walters
- Richard Overy
- Michael Lynch
- Sönke Neitzel
- Toby Thacker
- Emma Craigie

== Reception ==
Sheldon Kirshner for The Times of Israel praised the portrayal of several events as 'professional' and said the series was "aptly titled".
