= Nazi Megastructures =

- Presented by: James Holland; Tony Pollard
- Country of origin: United Kingdom

Production
- Production company: Darlow Smithson Productions

Original release
- Release: 2013 – 2019

Nazi Megastructures is a documentary television series appearing on the National Geographic Channel and a spinoff of the broader Megastructures television series. The series also aired as Nazi Mega Weapons on PBS, and as WWII Mega Weapons.

== Episodes ==
=== Season 1 ===
#	Title	Topics
1	The Atlantic Wall	Atlantic Wall
2	U-Boat Base	Lorient U-boat base
3	V2 Rocket Bases	V-2 rocket, Peenemünde Army Research Center, Mittelwerk
4	Super Tanks	Tiger I, Tiger II, Panzer VIII Maus
5	Hitler's Jet Caves	Messerschmitt Me 262
6	Fortress Berlin	Battle of Berlin, Flak tower, Führerbunker

=== Season 2 ===
#	Title	Topics
1	The Wolf's Lair	Wolf's Lair
2	Hitler's Megaships	German battleship Bismarck, German battleship Tirpitz
3	Himmler's SS	Heinrich Himmler, Schutzstaffel
4	V1: Hitler's Vengeance Missile	V-1 flying bomb
5	Kamikaze Suicide Bombers	Kamikaze, Kaiten, Yokosuka MXY-7 Ohka
6	Hitler's Siegfried Line	Siegfried Line

=== Season 3 ===
#	Title	Topic
1	The Eagle's Nest	Kehlsteinhaus, Berghof (residence), Obersalzberg
2	Hitler's Island Megafortress	German fortification of Guernsey, Fortifications of Alderney, Coastal fortifications of Jersey
3	Lightning War Machine	Blitzkrieg, Junkers Ju 87, Leuna works
4	Hitler's Killer Subs	Type VII submarine, U-995, V-80 submarine, Type XXI submarine
5	Pacific Megaships	Yamato, Musashi
6	Japanese Superfortress ("The Tunnels of Okinawa" in WWII Mega Weapons)	Battle of Okinawa

=== Season 4 ===
#	Title	Topics
1	Hitler's War Trains	Deutsche Reichsbahn, Holocaust trains, Breitspurbahn
2	Hitler's Railways Of Death	Deutsche Reichsbahn, Holocaust trains, Breitspurbahn
3	Hitler's Italian Fortress	Gothic Line
4	Hitler's Arctic Fortress	Festung Norwegen
5	Hitler's Propaganda Machine	Propaganda in Nazi Germany
6	Hitler's Luftwaffe	Luftwaffe

=== Season 5 ===
Season subtitle: Russia's War

#	Title	Topics
1	Blitzkrieg In The East	Operation Barbarossa
2	The Battle Of Kursk	Battle of Kursk, T-34, Panther tank, Tiger I
3	Hitler's Fighting Retreat	Festungsfront Oder-Warthe-Bogen

=== Season 6 ===
Season subtitle: America's War

#	Title	Topics
1	Japan's Warrior Code	Battle of Saipan
2	Japan's Island of Death	Battle of Peleliu
3	D-Day	D-Day landings
4	Pearl Harbor	Attack on Pearl Harbor
5	Hitler's Final Offensive	Battle of the Bulge
6	Fortress Japan	

=== Season 7 ===
#	Title	Topics
1	Hitler's war in the skies	Defence of the Reich
2	Hitler's British invasion plan	Operation Sea Lion
3	Hell island	Battle of Guadalcanal
4	Japan's death railway	The Burma Railway
5	Hitler's desert war	North African campaign
6	Hitler's Mediterranean fortress	Operation Mincemeat, Allied invasion of Sicily

== See also ==
- List of programs broadcast by National Geographic
