= Emily Shuckburgh =

Climate scientist

Emily Shuckburgh CBE FRMetS
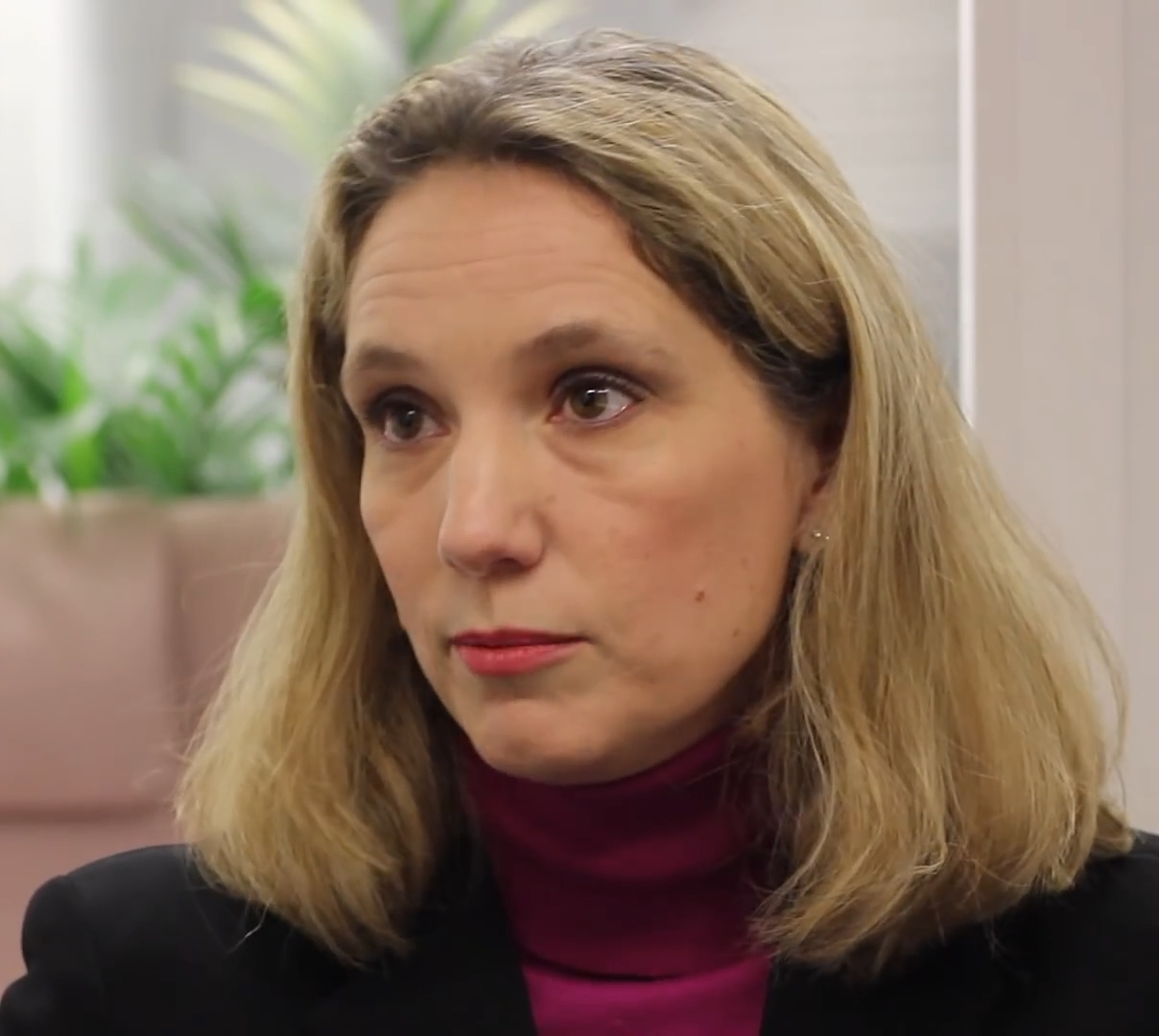
- Shuckburgh in 2017
- Born: Emily Fleur Shuckburgh
- Education: University of Oxford (BA); University of Cambridge (PhD)
- Known for: Cambridge Zero
- Scientific career
- Fields: Climate science
- Workplaces: University of Cambridge; Department for Energy Security and Net Zero (DESNZ); École normale supérieure Massachusetts Institute of Technology; British Antarctic Survey
- Thesis: Mixing and transport in atmospheric flows (2000)
- Website: www.cisl.cam.ac.uk/directory/emily-shuckburgh

Emily Fleur Shuckburgh is a British climate scientist, mathematician and science communicator. She was previously Director of Cambridge Zero, the University of Cambridge's climate change initiative. She is Academic Director of the Institute of Computing for Climate Science, Professor of Environmental Data Science at the Computer Laboratory Co-Director of the Centre for Landscape Regeneration and of the UKRI Centre for Doctoral Training on the Application of AI to the study of Environmental Risks (AI4ER) and is a fellow of Darwin College, Cambridge. Her research interests include the dynamics of the atmosphere, oceans and climate and environmental data science. She is a theoretician, numerical modeller and observational scientist.

In November 2025, Professor Emily Shuckburgh was appointed the Chief Scientific Adviser (CSA) for the Department for Energy Security and Net Zero (DESNZ). She retains her role as Professor of Environmental Data Science at the Department of Computer Science and Technology at the University of Cambridge.

== Education ==
Shuckburgh attended Magdalen College, Oxford, where she earned a Bachelor of Arts degree in Mathematics in 1994. She subsequently completed Part III of the Mathematical Tripos at Trinity College, Cambridge followed by a PhD in applied mathematics at the University of Cambridge in 1999.

== Career and research ==
Shuckburgh was a postdoctoral researcher at École normale supérieure in Paris from 2001 to 2003 and at Massachusetts Institute of Technology (MIT) in 2005 as a visiting scientist, working in the areas of atmosphere and ocean dynamics.

- 2000-03 Research Fellow at Darwin College, Cambridge
- 2001-03 EC Marie Curie Research Fellow at École normale supérieure (Paris)
- 2003-06 Director, Geophysical and Environmental Fluid Dynamics Summer School, Dept Applied Mathematics & Theoretical Physics, University of Cambridge
- 2009-15 Head, Open Oceans, British Antarctic Survey (BAS)
- 2019 Reader, Department of Computer Science and Technology, University of Cambridge
- 2025 Professor, Department of Computer Science and Technology, University of Cambridge
- 2025 Chief Scientific Advisor, Department for Energy Security and Net Zero (DESNZ)

In 2000, Shuckburgh became a research fellow of Darwin College, Cambridge, and a fellow in mathematics in 2003; as of 2019 she holds several positions within the University of Cambridge – she is a reader in the Department of Computer Science and Technology, an associate fellow of the Centre for Science and Policy and fellow of the Cambridge Institute for Sustainability Leadership. Shuckburgh leads the UKRI Centre for Doctoral Training in the Application of AI to the Study of Environmental Risks.

She joined the British Antarctic Survey in 2006 where she led the Natural Environment Research Council (NERC) Ocean Regulation of Climate by Heat and Carbon Sequestration and Transports (ORCHESTRA) project. She became the Survey's head of Open Oceans in 2009, deputy head of the Polar Oceans Team in 2015, and a fellow in 2019. Her research interests include the dynamics of the atmosphere, oceans and climate and environmental data science. She is a theoretician, numerical modeller and observational scientist.

She serves as co-chair of the Royal Meteorological Society climate science communications group and chaired their scientific publications committee. She acted as an advisor to the UK Government on behalf of the NERC.

=== Science communication ===
Shuckburgh has written on climate science, sustainability and women in science for publications including the Financial Times, New Statesman and The Sunday Times. She has also written books, and was co-author of Climate Change for the Ladybird Expert series with the Prince of Wales and Tony Juniper. She serves on the board of the Campaign for Science and Engineering.

=== Publications ===
Her publications include:

- Shuckburgh, Emily; Chambers, Catherine (2015) [2014]. The Coolest Jobs on the Planet: Polar Scientist. London: Raintree. ISBN 978-1-406-28011-1.
- HRH The Prince of Wales; Juniper, Tony; Shuckburgh, Emily (26 January 2017). Climate Change. illus. Ruth Palmer. London: Ladybird Books. ISBN 978-0-7181-8585-5.

=== Awards and honours ===
In 2016 she was awarded an Order of the British Empire (OBE) in the 2016 New Year Honours for "services to science and the public communication of science". She was subsequently appointed a Commander of the British Empire (CBE) in the 2025 Birthday Honours for "services to climate science and to the public communication of climate science". She is a Fellow of the Royal Meteorological Society (FRMetS).
