= Sam Willis =

British historian and television presenter

Samuel Bruce Adlam Willis
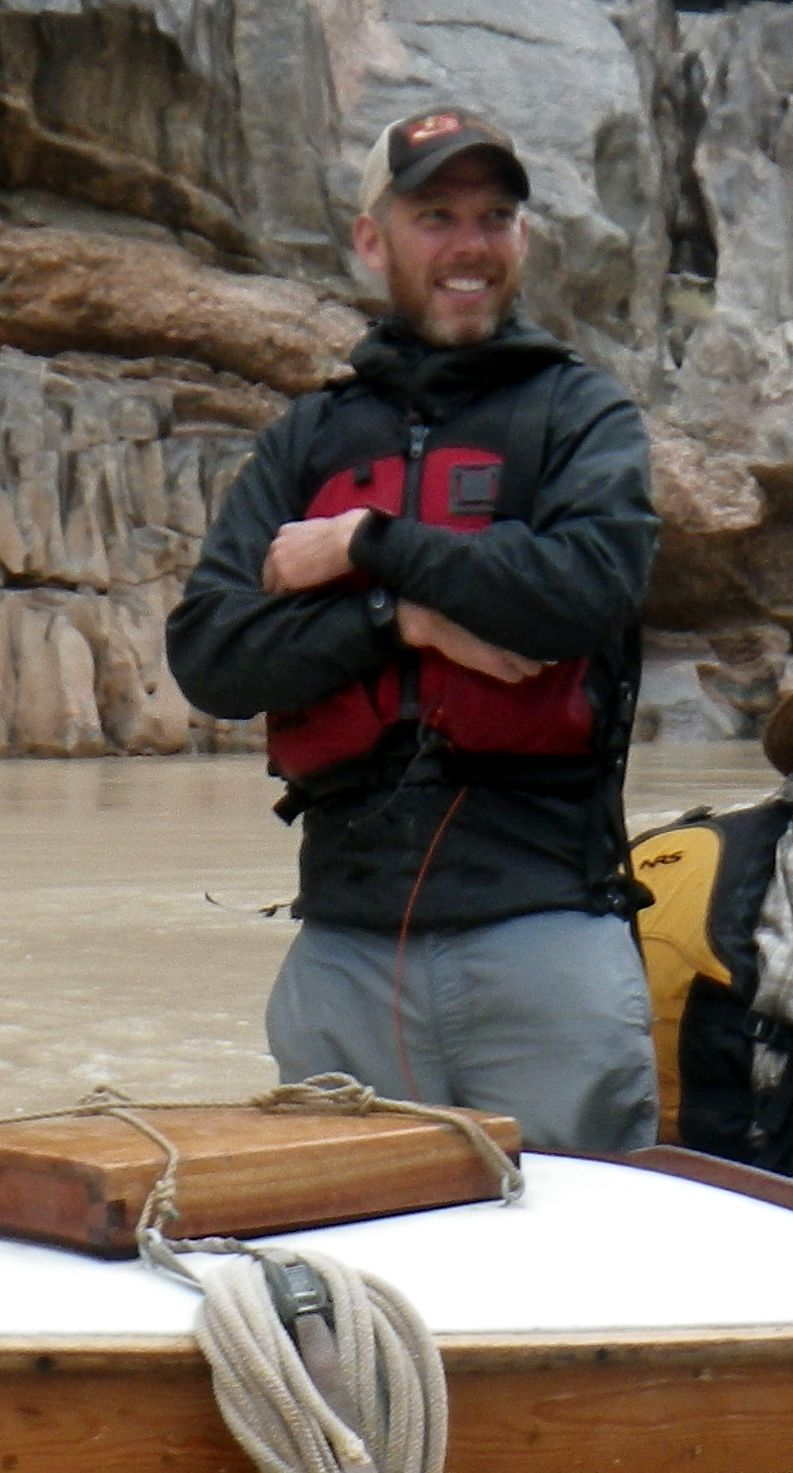
- Born: 24 April 1977 (age 49)
- Occupations: Writer; Public historian
- Known for: TV/Media work; Books
- Awards: Anderson Medal (2011)

Academic background
- Education: University of Exeter; University of Bristol
- Thesis: Capability, control and tactics in the eighteenth century Royal Navy (2004)
- Doctoral advisor: Nicholas Rodger

Academic work
- Discipline: History
- Sub-discipline: Naval history
- Website: sam-willis.com

Samuel Bruce Adlam Willis (born 24 April 1977) is a British historian, television presenter and writer. He is a visiting Fellow in Maritime and Naval History at the University of Plymouth, and a Fellow of the Society of Antiquaries. He is the editor of Navy Records Online, the online-publishing branch of the Navy Records Society. Willis has published fourteen books and numerous academic articles on maritime and naval history.

== Education ==
Willis studied History and Archaeology at the University of Exeter, graduating in 2000. He earned a PhD in Naval History from the same university, studying under Professor Nicholas Rodger. He also went on to research for an MA in Maritime Archaeology from the University of Bristol where he studied under Professor Mark Horton.

== Career ==
He made numerous appearances on TV and Radio as an expert contributor before he presented Nelson's Caribbean Hell-Hole, a 2012 film for BBC4 about the excavation of a mass burial site near the British naval dockyard at English Harbour in Antigua.

In 2013, he presented a three-part series for BBC4 on the cultural history of shipwrecks and was one of the nine-man crew that recreated John Wesley Powell's epic uncharted 1869 voyage down the Colorado River through the Grand Canyon in Whitehall boats, that was filmed and broadcast by BBC2 in January 2014. In October 2014 he presented a three-part series on castles for BBC4: Castles: Britain's Fortified History.

In October 2015 he presented another three-part series for BBC4 Britain's Outlaws: Highwaymen, Pirates & Rogues. In 2016 the BBC broadcast The Silk Road, a series following Willis's journey from Xi'an to Venice. Willis's first series for National Geographic, Nazi Weird War Two, was broadcast in December 2016. The show in which Willis teams up with Robert Joe, an urban explorer, has been described as 'one of the oddest partnerships since Mulder and Scully'.

In early 2017 Willis presented another three-part series on the evolution of British arms and weaponry, in the same format as his 2014 series on castles, again for BBC4: Sword, Musket and Machine Gun: Britain's Armed History. In 2017, Willis presented two other 3-part TV series: Maritime Silk Road Reborn for National Geographic and Invasion! for BBC Four. In 2018 Willis presented 'Silk Railroad' for National Geographic and in 2019 a six-part series 'China Relics Decoded' also for National Geographic.

Willis presents two podcasts: 'Histories of the Unexpected', a show which demonstrates that everything has a history, even the most unexpected of subjects; and since 2020 Willis has been presenting the Mariner's Mirror Podcast, a podcast dedicated to maritime and naval history.

== Publications ==
His first book, Fighting at Sea in the Eighteenth Century: The Art of Sailing Warfare was based on his PhD thesis and was a revisionist study of the history of tactics in the Age of Sail. It explained in greater detail than ever before how battles were won or lost in the Age of Sail. His subsequent books include the Hearts of Oak Trilogy and the Fighting Ships series.

In 2011, he was awarded the Society for Nautical Research's Anderson Medal for his biography of the naval battle the Glorious First of June, the final instalment of his Hearts of Oak Trilogy.

In 2010, he made a discovery in the British Library of previously unpublished naval dispatches from the French Revolutionary and Napoleonic Wars, which became the subject of his 2013 book, In The Hour of Victory.

- Fighting at Sea in the Eighteenth Century: the Art of Sailing Warfare, Woodbridge, 2008 ISBN 1843833670
- Shipwrecks: A History of Disasters at Sea, London 2009, ISBN 1847247628
- Fighting Ships from the Ancient World to 1750, London 2010, ISBN 1847248802
- Fighting Ships 1750-1850, London 2007, ISBN 1847241719
- Fighting Ships 1850-1950, London 2008, ISBN 1847244165
- The Fighting Temeraire, London 2009, ISBN 1847249981
- The Admiral Benbow, London 2010, ISBN 1849160368
- The Glorious First of June, 2012, ISBN 1849160384
- In the Hour of Victory: The Royal Navy at War in the Age of Nelson, London 2013, ISBN 0857895702
- The Struggle for Sea Power: A Naval History of the American Revolution, New York and London 2015, ISBN 978-0-393-23992-8
- The Spanish Armada, Ladybird Expert Series, Illustrated by Paul Young, London 2018, ISBN 978-0-7181-8857-3
- The Battle of the Nile, Ladybird Expert Series, Illustrated by Paul Young, London 2019, ISBN 978-0-7181-8858-0
- The Battle of Trafalgar, Ladybird Expert Series, Illustrated by Paul Young, London 2019, ISBN 978-0-7181-8873-3
- A General History of the Lives, Murders and Adventures of the Most Notorious Highwaymen London 2020, ISBN 978-0-7123-5274-1
- A General History of the Lives, Murders and Adventures of the Most Notorious Pirates London 2020, ISBN 978-0-7123-5390-8
- A General History of the Lives, Murders and Adventures of the Most Notorious Rogues London 2020, ISBN 978-0-7123-5339-7

Alongside the 'Histories of the Unexpected' podcast, Willis has co-written a series of books with James Daybell.

- Histories of the Unexpected: How Everything Has A History, Atlantic Books 2018, ISBN 9781786494122
- Histories of the Unexpected: The Romans, Atlantic Books 2019, ISBN 9781786497710
- Histories of the Unexpected: The Tudors, Atlantic Books 2019, ISBN 9781786497697
- Histories of the Unexpected: The Vikings, Atlantic Books 2019, ISBN 9781786497734
- Histories of the Unexpected: The World War Two, Atlantic Books 2019, ISBN 9781786497758
