= Escape Routes (book) =

Short story collection by Naomi Ishiguro

First edition

Escape Routes is the debut collection of short stories from author Naomi Ishiguro. The 2020 publication from Tinder Press consists of eight short stories and a novella, all with somewhat fantastical themes. One reviewer praised "her audacious talent and her ability to satirise the modern world." While reviewers generally liked the work, they found some stories to be more successful than others: particularly the novella, "The Rat Catcher," was criticised as "overextended".

Ishiguro is the daughter of Nobel Prize-winning author Kazuo Ishiguro and had studied English at University College London before pursuing a master's degree in creative writing at the University of East Anglia.
