= Mr B's Emporium of Reading Delights =

Bookshop in Bath, England

Coordinates: 51°23′01″N 2°21′44″W

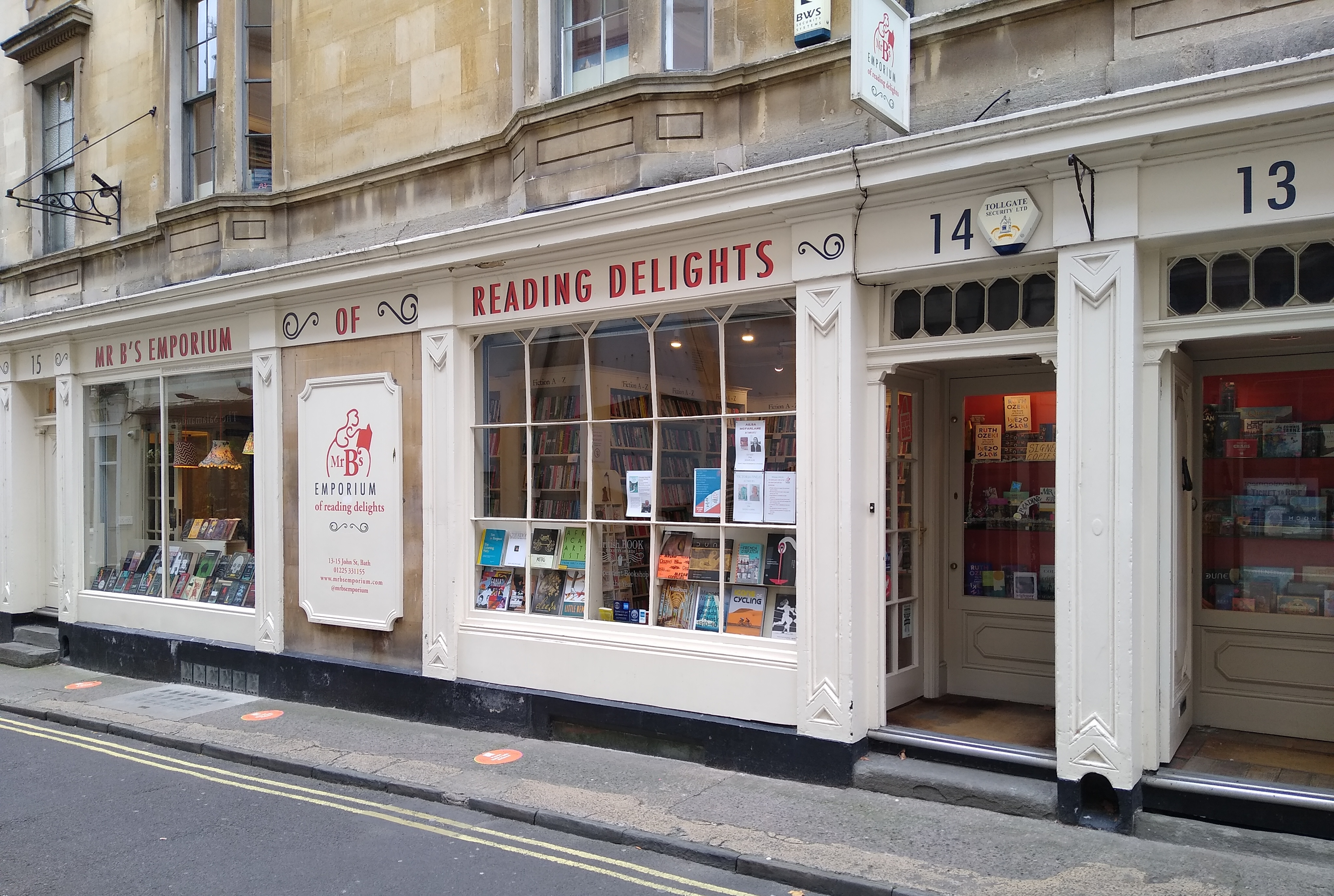
Mr B's Emporium of Reading Delights

Mr B's Emporium of Reading Delights is an independent bookshop based in John Street, Bath, Somerset. It was founded by former lawyer and derivatives trader Nic Bottomley and his wife, Juliette, also a lawyer.

In 2009, it was appointed as the official bookseller of the Bath Literary Festival. In 2011, it won the Bookseller's Award for Independent Bookshop of the Year, which it had won previously in 2008.

The shop organises several reading clubs and has a resident band which plays at author signings and other events.
