= Nikosthenes =

6th-century BC Greek potter

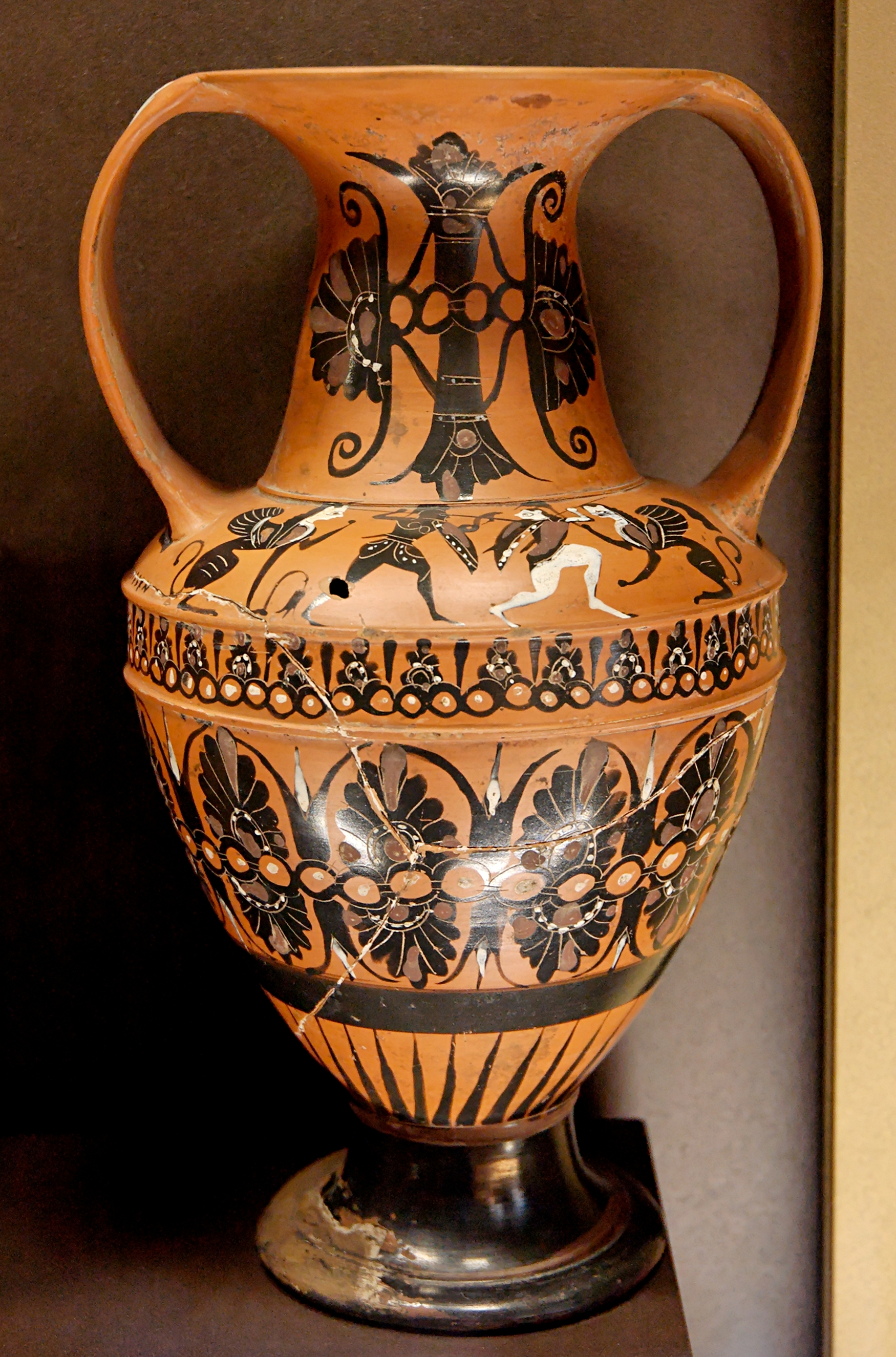
- Amazonomachy. Side A from an Attic black-figure Nikosthenic amphora, ca. 520–510 BC, located in Paris, Louvre, F 111.
- Born: Nikosthenes; Before 550 BC; Possibly Chalkis
- Died: Around 510 BC; Athens
- Known for: Pottery workshop, vase painting
- Notable work: Mainly low-quality kylixes, amphorae and others manufactured in the Etruscan style for the Etruscan market, 133 signed.
- Movement: Mainly the black-figure style, some later in the red-figure style

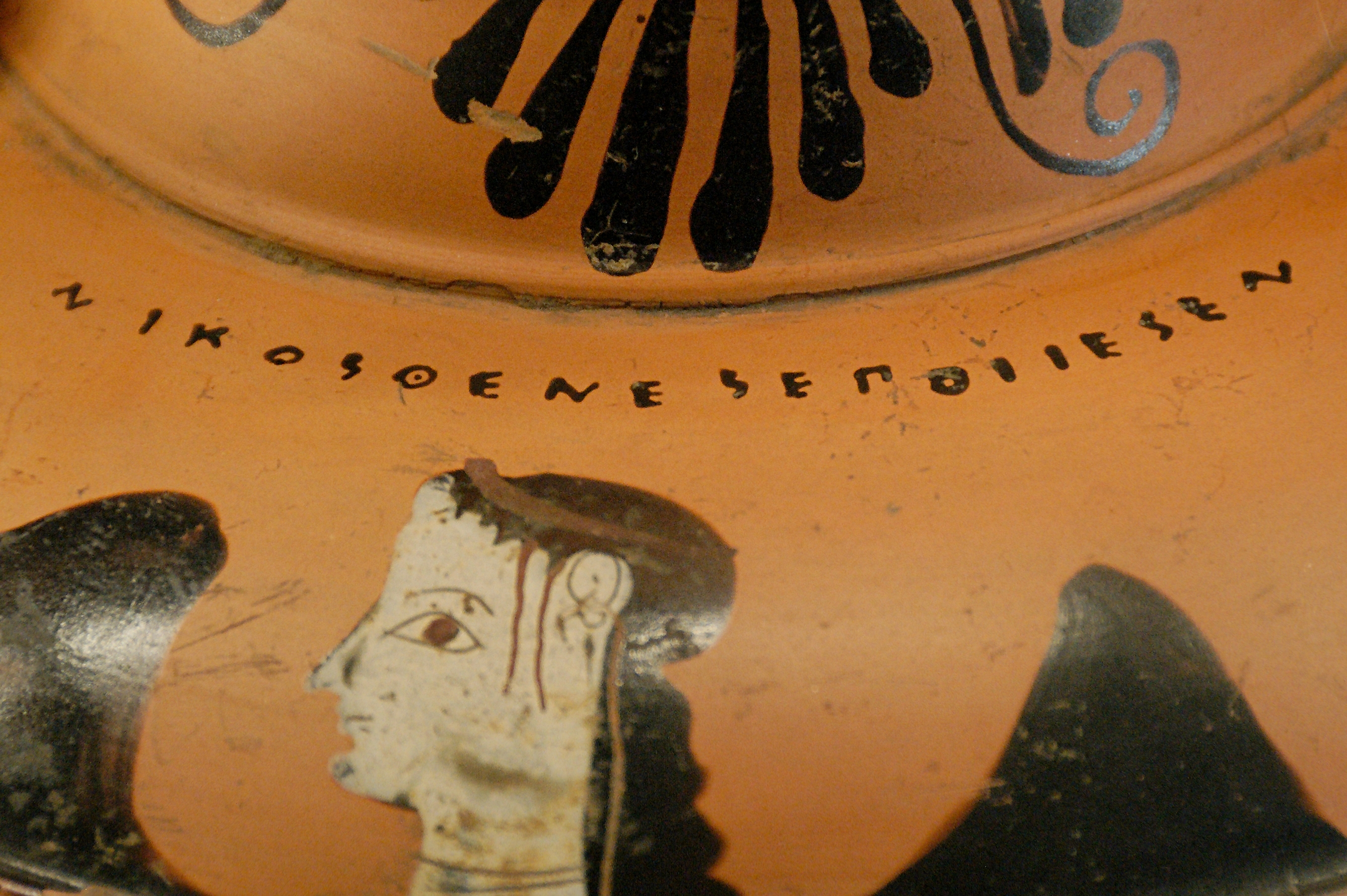
Nikosthenes' signature (Nikosthenes epoiesen) on the neck of a black-figure Nikosthenic amphora, c. 530–520 BC, located in the Louvre

Nikosthenes was a potter of Greek black- and red-figure pottery in the time window 550–510 BC. He signed as the potter on over 120 black-figure vases, but only nine red-figure. Most of his vases were painted by someone else, called Painter N (for Nikosthenes). Beazley considers the painting "slovenly and dissolute;" that is, not of high quality. In addition, he is thought to have worked with the painters Anakles, Oltos, Lydos and Epiktetos. Six's technique is believed to have been invented in Nikosthenes' workshop, possibly by Nikosthenes himself, around 530 BC. He is considered transitional between black-figure and red-figure pottery.

== The pottery workshop ==
Nikosthenes was the owner of a workshop in Athens in the latter part of the 6th century BC. On the theory that the number of signed works reflects the number of total works, the high number of signatures referring to Nikosthenes suggests that he had one of the largest if not the largest manufacturing center in Athens. He is noted for specializing in production of vases for the Etruscan market. In particular the so-called Nikosthenic amphora, the Attic kyathos and the Nikosthenic pyxis were designed on Etruscan shapes and exported to Etruria with no known local examples in Athens. In spite of this the majority of the production of the workshop was devoted to kylixes and amphorae.

There is considerable discussion about the size of the workshop. Identification of the products of the workshop are based primarily on the large number (133) vases signed by Nikosthenes epoiesen (Niksothenes made me) and similar variants. The signatures were placed on the vase in glaze (paint) and show a variety of hands and spellings. Added to these vases are vases which can be linked to these vases on the basis of detailed stylistic analysis. Most scholars would accept that it contained about 30 to 40 workers at any one time between 530 and 505. In 1999, V. Tosto proposed that the workshop employed a small handful of assistants and temporary workers around Nikosthenes, who worked as both painter and potter. This view has been rejected by Michael M. Eisman, who not only supports the larger sized workshop but has suggested that Nikosthenes himself came from Chalkis, and began working with a small workshop of Anakles around 550 BC before starting his own workshop. He signed one vase with Anakles.

The workshop seems to have passed into the hands of his partner, Pamphaios, somewhere between 505 and 500 BC and continued under his direction for a number of years before it disappeared at about 490.

== The ceramics ==
The Nikosthenic production while large is not particularly distinguished for its quality. While the vases are well potted and the overall quality of the painting is good there only a few outstanding vases that would hold their own with the more distinguished painters working at that time. In addition to the painters of the Nikosthenic amphora and kyathoi a number of well-known painters were part of the workshop at various times including Psiax, Oltos, the BMN Painter and the Theseus Painter. It is possible that there was a connection with the Andokides workshop which produce very high quality vases in small quantities. One of its primary painters, the Lysippides Painter, may have produced a series of elaborate kylixes with gorgoneion heads in the interior for the workshop.
