= Panathenaic prize amphora by the Euphiletos Painter =

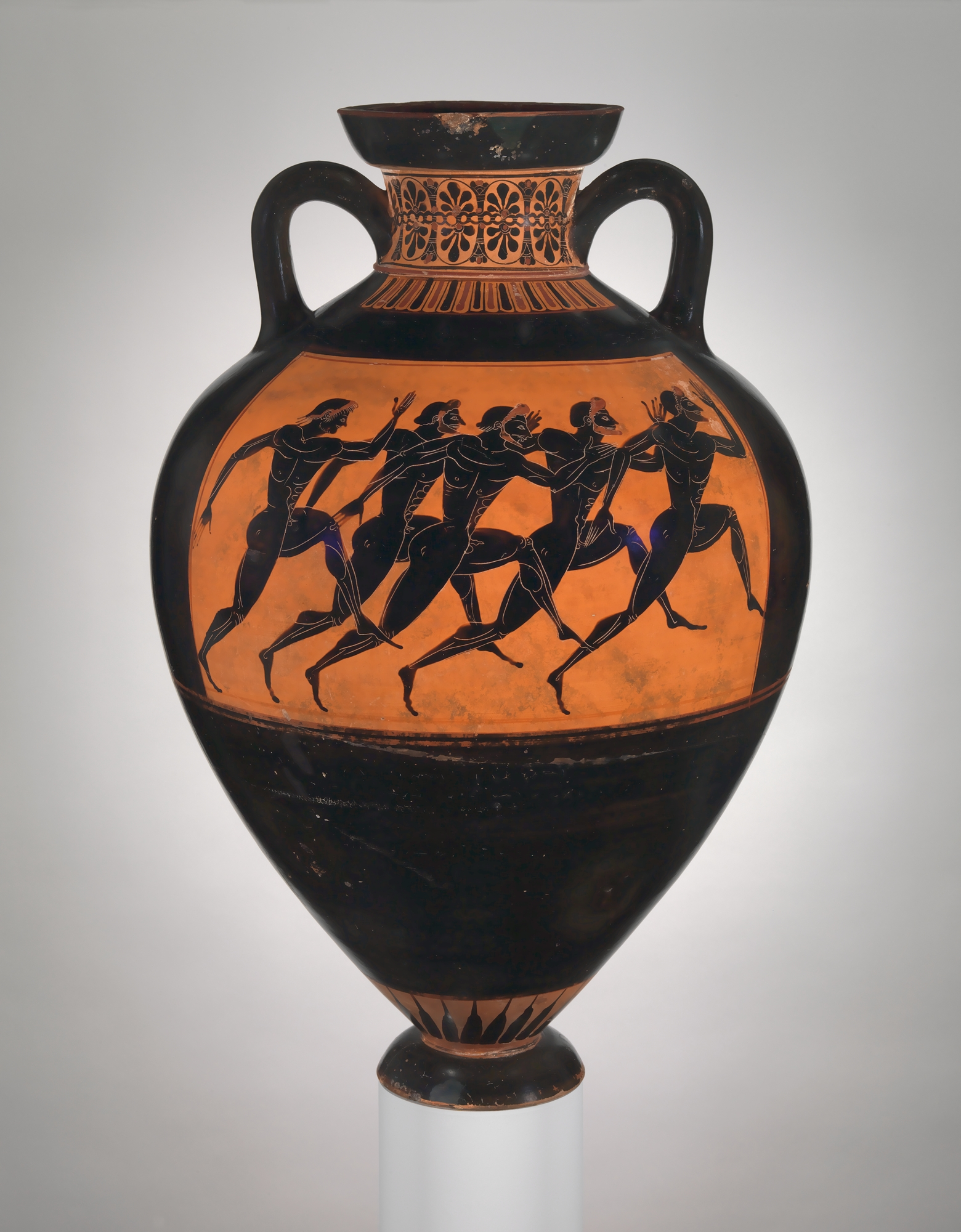
Side depicting a foot race

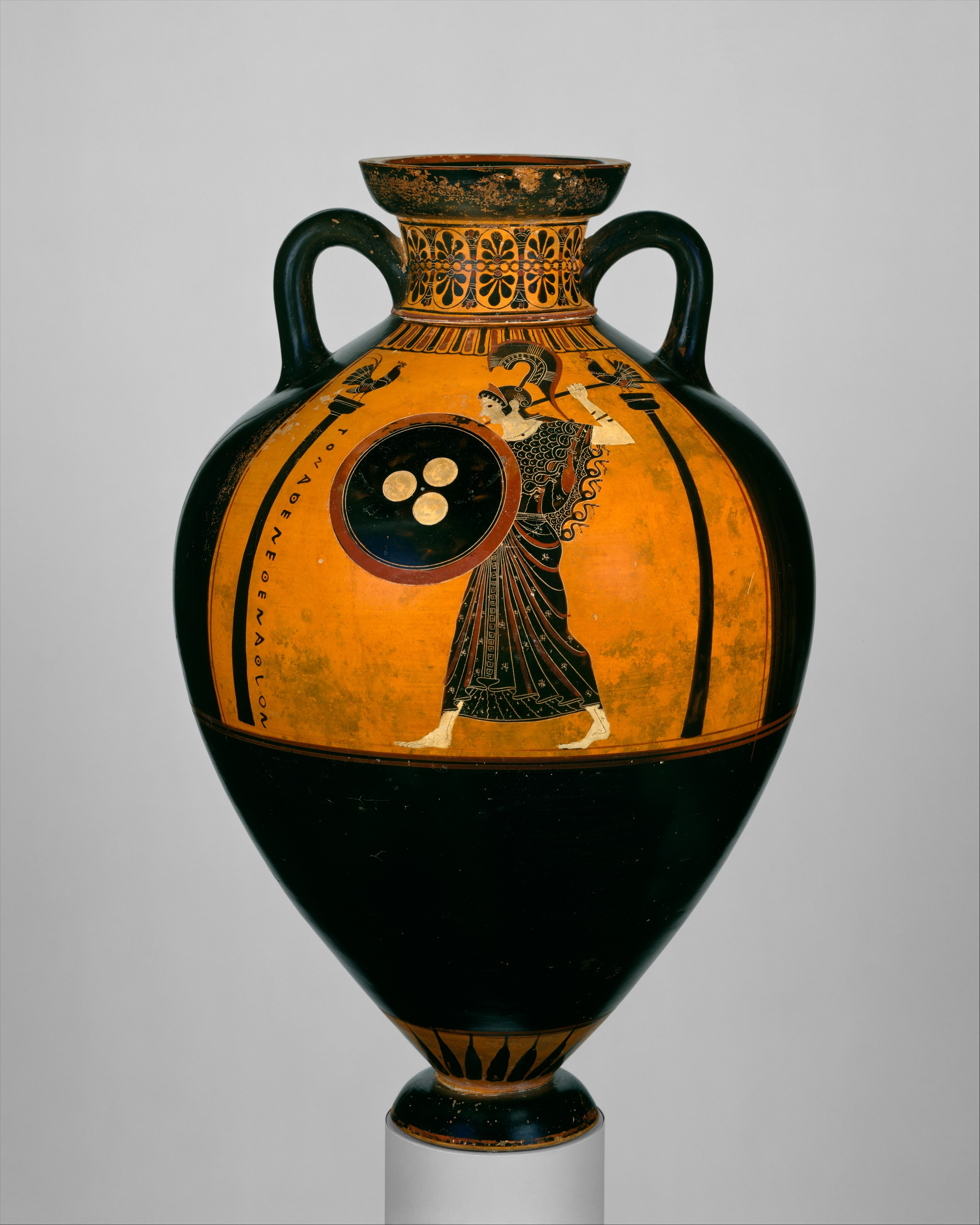
Side depicting Athena

The Panathenaic Amphora by the Euphiletos Painter is a black-figure terracotta Panathenaic amphora from the Archaic Period depicting a running race, now in the Metropolitan Museum of Art in New York. It was painted by the Euphiletos Painter as a victory prize for the Panathenaic Games in Athens in 530 BC.

== Description ==
The amphora was made by the Euphiletos Painter in 530 BC near the end of the Archaic Period of Greece. It was excavated in Vulci. Made out of terracotta, the amphora has a height of 24.5 inches (62.2 cm). On one side of the vase there is a depiction of a foot race, or stadion, and on the other side of the vase is a depiction of Athena Promachos. Many Panathenaic amphorae featured Athena in this pose and the event for which the vase was a prize for on the other side. Athena, brandishing a spear in one hand and a shield in the other, stands in between two pillars that have roosters sitting atop them. Alongside the left pillar is an inscription in Greek. This Attic amphora is painted in the black figure style, typical of all Panathenaic amphorae. Stemming from Proto-Corinthian roots, black-figure style includes incised details with silhouetted figures on a glossy vase. The silhouetted figures are the men in the stadion who are nude, bearded, and muscular. Running nude was part of the stadion, known as the gymnikos agon or nude struggle. Their musculature is highlighted through the use of incision creating white lines against the black figures. Each of the five men have their left leg extended forward in a long stride. The vase itself is mostly black with the silhouetted figures placed within the reddish brown spaces. Surrounding the rim of the vase's neck is a painted black chain, which, above and below it, has a repeating design. Its black handles stem from the neck of the vase to the top of the body.

== Function ==
The function of these Panathenaic prize amphorae is that they are symbols of status. These vases commemorated the athleticism of these games and the cultural importance of winning such games. Some of the games that were held include stadion, pankration, music and equestrian events. Serving as a prize for winning these events, this amphora would have been filled with olive oil from Athena's sacred and publicly-owned olive groves, which was a commodity held in respect by the Greeks. Amphorae served primarily as vessels for storage evolving from pithos jars, and later, during the Late Geometric Period, they were used as marker vases for graves: their depictions and size giving indications of the social status of the deceased. Then during the Orientalizing period, small vessels called aryballos were used to hold more valuable oils like perfumes. This evolution from storage to social status led to the creation of Panathenaic prize amphorae: symbols of status through their decorations and storage of sacred oil. The Euphiletos painter painted during the sixth century BC and created many Panathenaic prize amphorae. This amphora was one of the many he painted of various events in Panathenaic games.
