= N Painter =

Attic black-figure vase painter

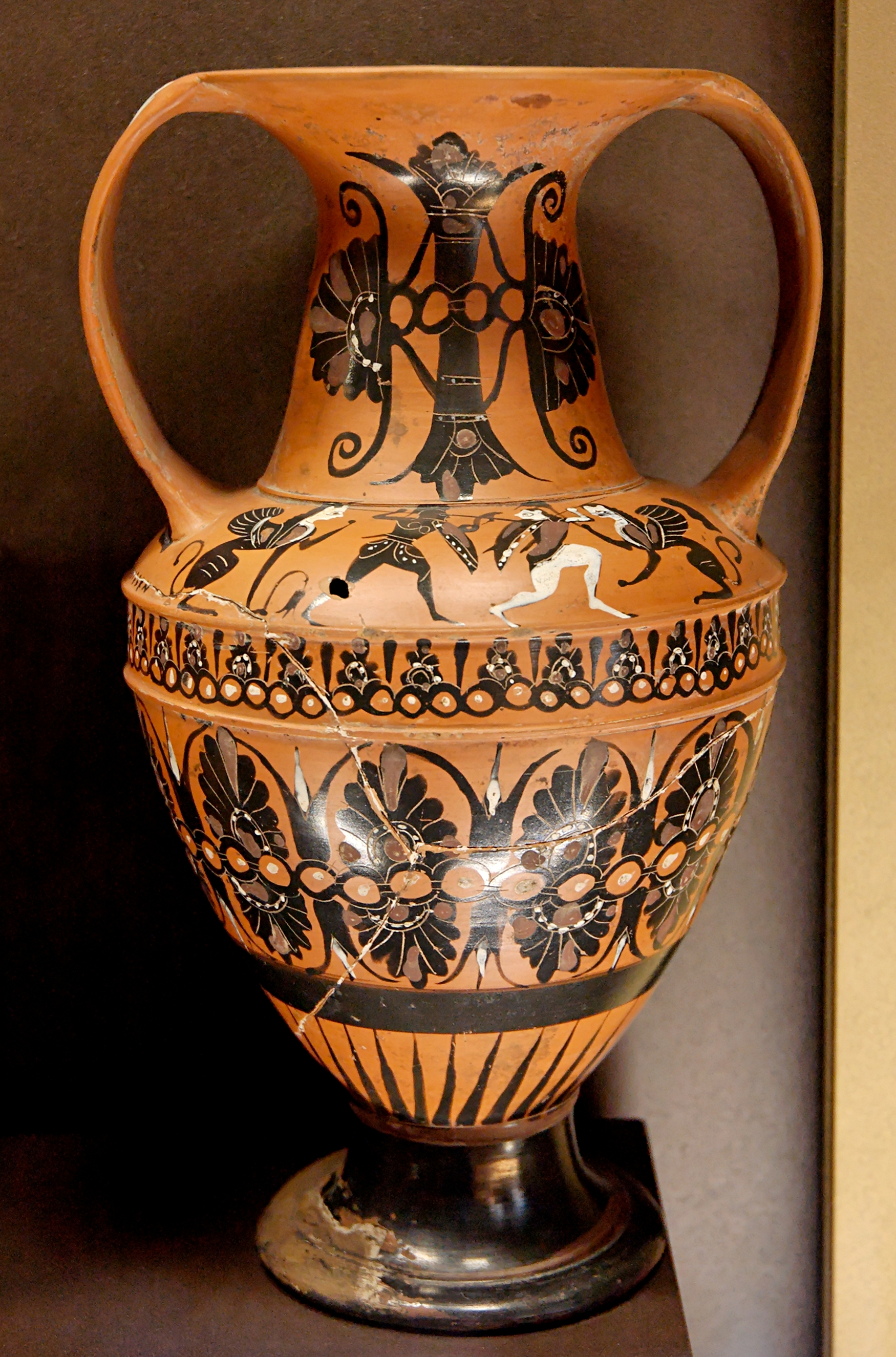
Amazonomachy, Nikosthenic amphora, circa 520 BC, Louvre (F 111)

The N Painter was an Attic black-figure vase painter of the third quarter of the 6th century BC. His real name remains unknown.

The N Painter was named after the potter Nikosthenes, as he worked in the latter's workshop and was his most important collaborator. Modern scholarship assumes that N Painter painted all known Nikosthenic amphorae. He also decorated several kyathoi, cups and a psykter. Some scholars suggest that N Painter and the potter Nikosthenes may be identical.

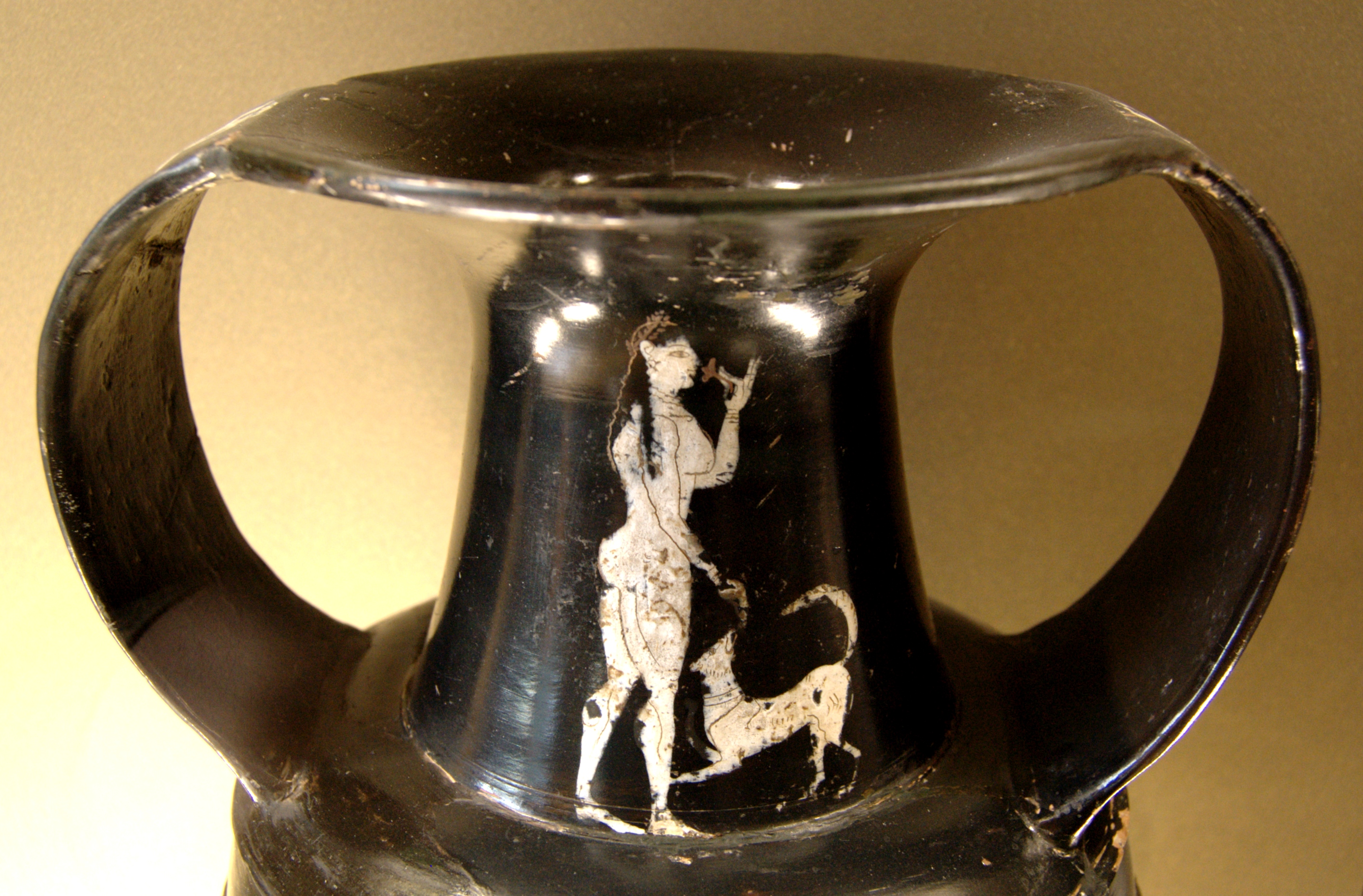
A woman and dog on the neck of Nikosthenic amphora ca. 520 BC, Louvre (F 114)

The vases painted by N Painter are mostly dated to the 530s and 520 BC. Especially his larger figures are of considerable quality, while John Boardman condemns his smaller works as simply boring and sometimes sloppy, not very different from mass-produced wares. His plant ornaments are particularly poor.

== Bibliography ==
- John D. Beazley: Attic Black-Figure Vase-Painters, Oxford 1956, p.
- John Boardman: Schwarzfigurige Vasen aus Athen. Ein Handbuch, Mainz 1977, ISBN 3-8053-0233-9, S. 73
