= Nikosthenic amphora =

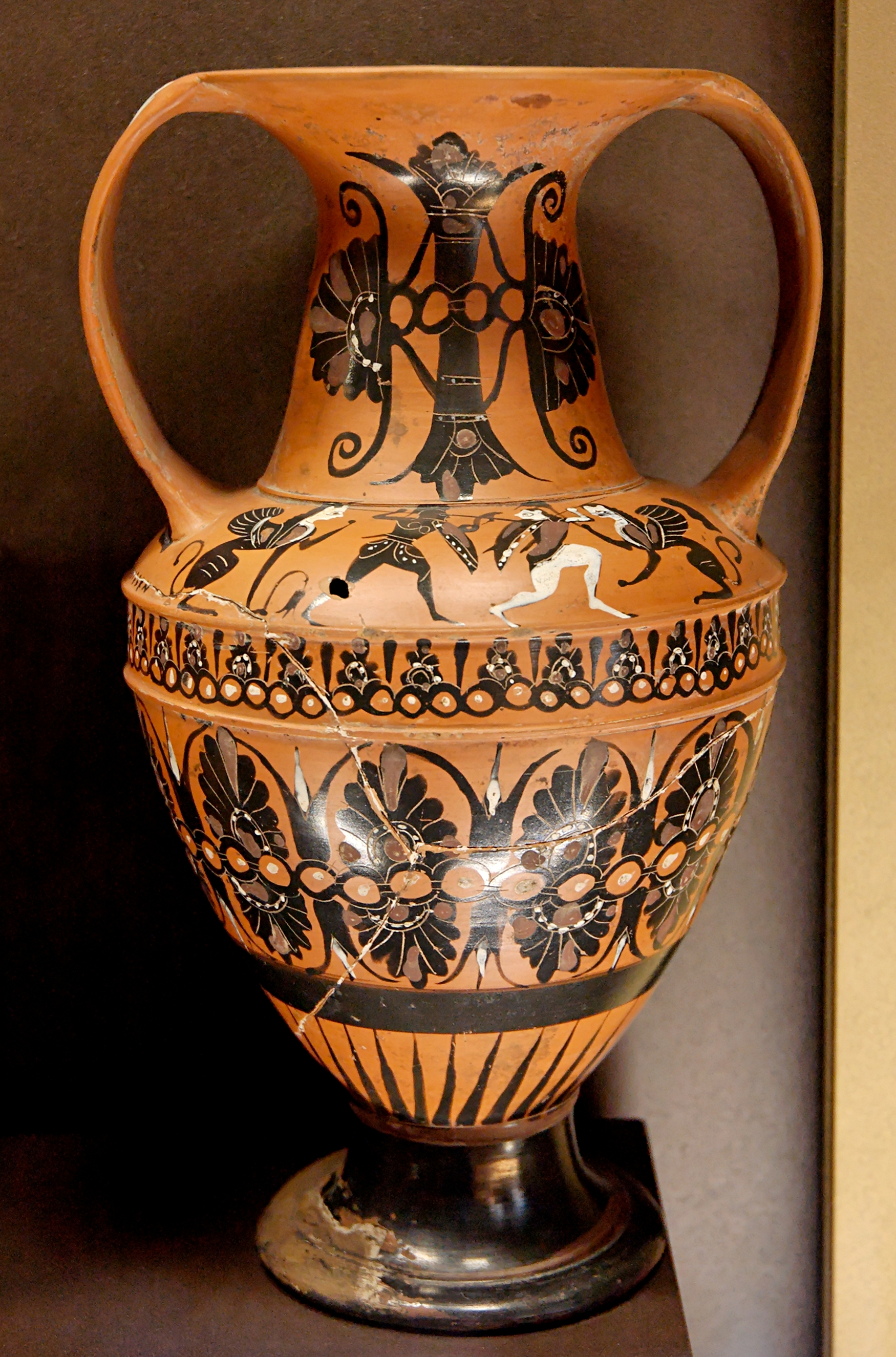
Amazonomachy on a Nikosthenic amphora by Nikosthenes and the N Painter, ca. 520 BC, Louvre

A Nikosthenic amphora is a type of Attic vase invented in the late 6th century BC by the potter Nikosthenes, aimed specifically for export to Etruria. Inspired by Etruscan Bucchero types, it is the characteristic product of the Nikosthenes-Pamphaios workshop.

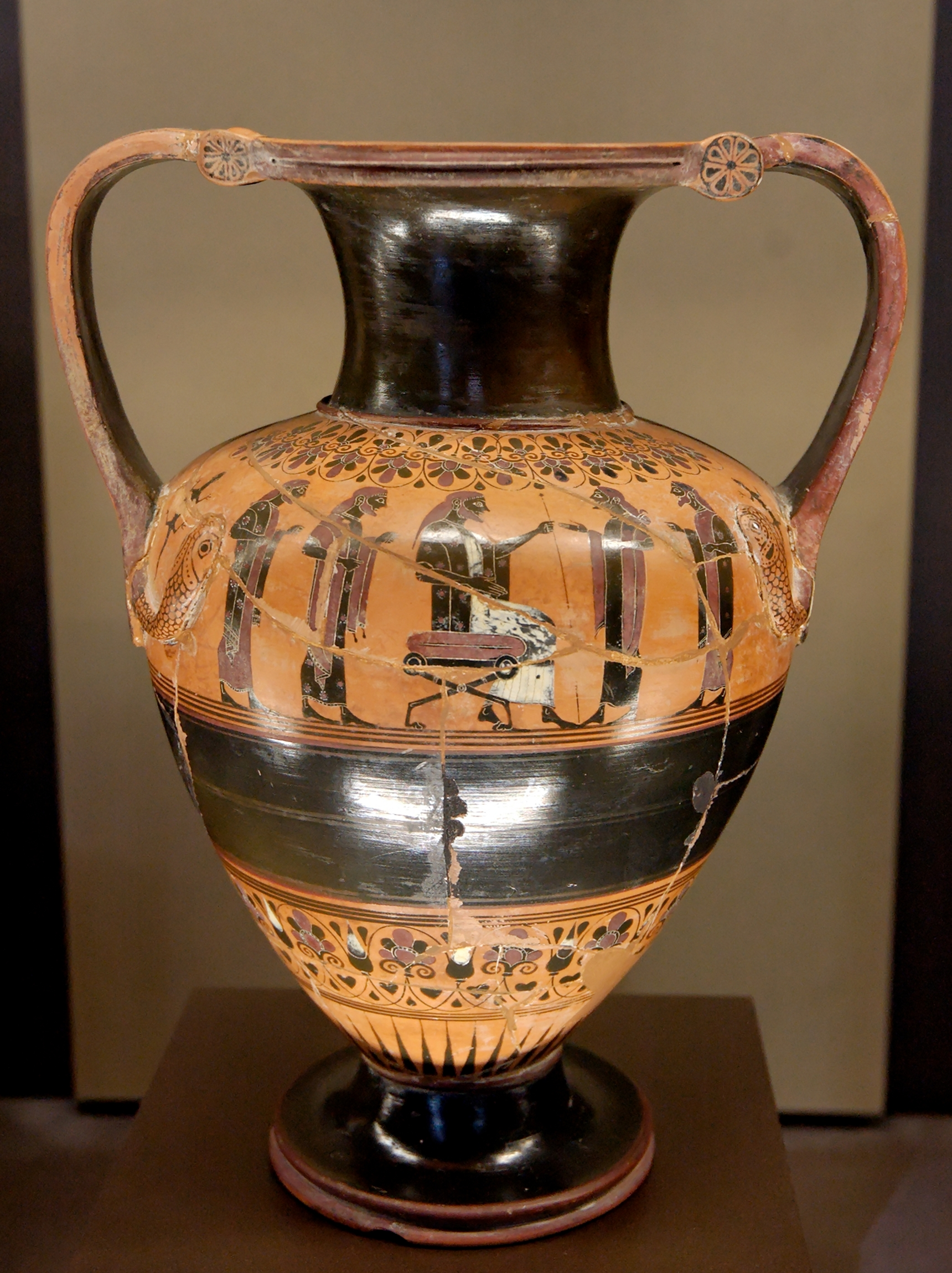
Nikosthenic amphora, probably painted by the BMN Painter, ca. 530 BC, Louvre

Characteristic features are the angular body of the amphora and the broad flat handles. The Etruscan predecessors were black-painted, whereas the Attic vases were decorated in the black-figure style. Nearly all known examples were found in Caere, while the majority of Nikosthenes products in other shapes were discovered in Vulci. This suggests that the type was specifically made for sale in or to Caere, which indicates that Nikosthenes must have been a gifted salesman and that an efficient system of intermediate traders must have existed. Niksothenes created or introduced several vase shapes, but the Nikosthenic amphora is his most famous innovation.

The clay of the Nikosthenic amphorae is bright orange-red, and thus provides a perfect base for black-figure vase painting. Their decoration follows quite varied patterns. Sometimes, they are subdivided in two or three separate friezes, mostly of plant and animal motifs. In other cases, images cover the whole vase body.

Apparently most, perhaps even all, Nikosthenic amphorae were painted by N Painter, which has been suggested to be identical with Nikosthenes. Production began around 530 to 520 BC and continued under Nikosthenes' successor Pamphaios – at that stage in the red-figure style – to cease between 500 and 490 BC.

== Bibliography ==
- John Boardman: Schwarzfigurige Vasen aus Athen. Ein Handbuch, Mainz 1977, p. 72 (Kulturgeschichte der Antiken Welt, Vol. 1) ISBN 3-8053-0233-9
- Thomas Mannack: Griechische Vasenmalerei. Eine Einführung. Theiss, Stuttgart 2002, p. 123 ISBN 3-8062-1743-2.
- Wolfgang Schiering: Die griechischen Tongefässe. Gestalt, Bestimmung und Formenwandel. 2. Auflage. Mann, Berlin 1983, p. 37f., 46–48, 152 (Gebr.-Mann-Studio-Reihe) ISBN 3-7861-1325-4.
