= Bucchero =

Etruscan ceramics style

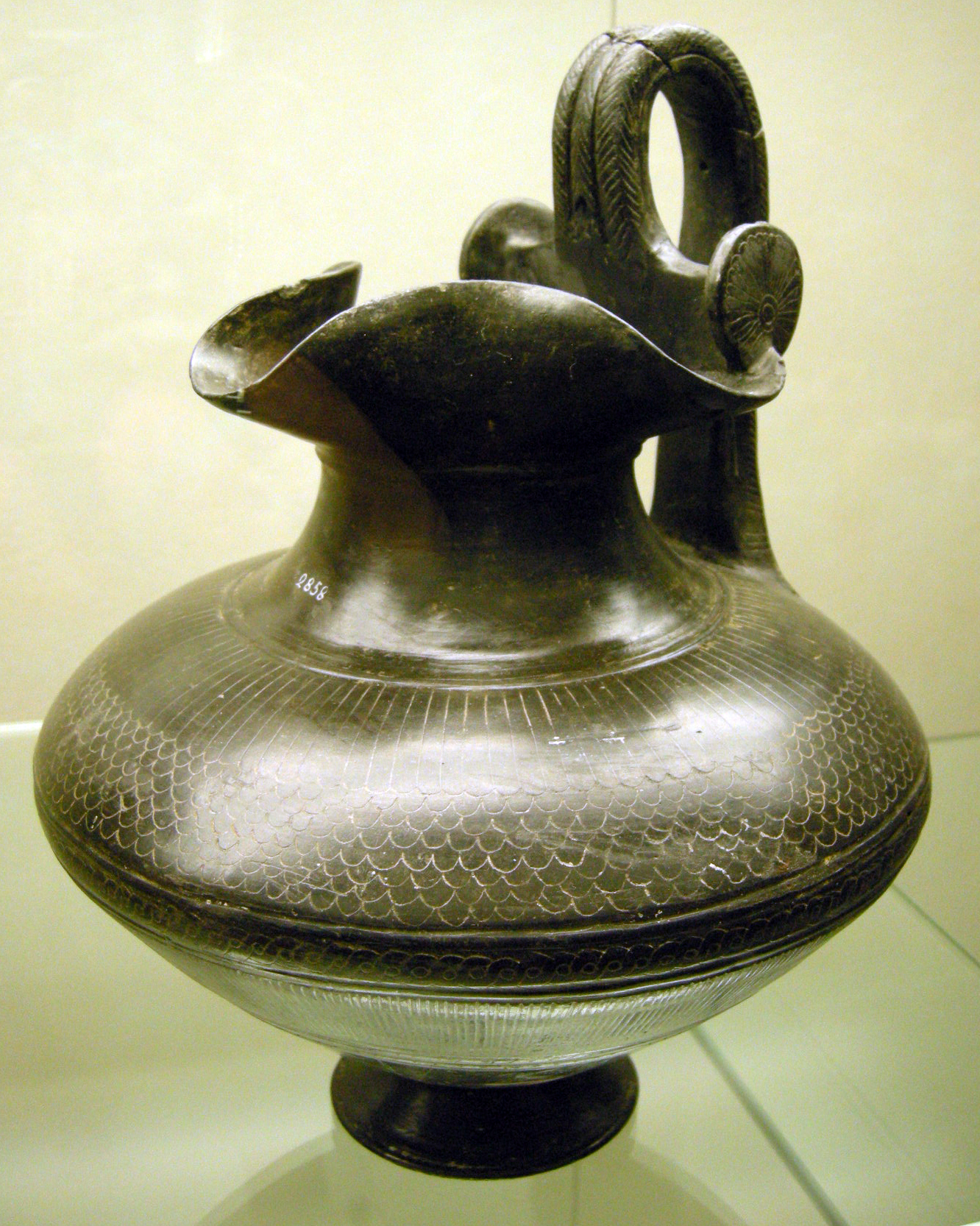
Oinochoe in bucchero

Bucchero (Italian pronunciation: [ˈbukkero]) is a class of ceramics produced in central Italy by the region's pre-Roman Etruscan population. This Italian word is derived from the Latin poculum, a drinking-vessel, perhaps through the Spanish búcaro, or the Portuguese púcaro.

Regarded as the "national" pottery of ancient Etruria, bucchero ware is distinguished by its black fabric as well as glossy, black surface achieved through the unique "reduction" method in which it was fired. After the leather-hard unfired ware was arranged in the kiln and the fire started, the vent holes were closed, thus reducing the supply of oxygen required in a normal kiln firing. In the smoke-filled atmosphere of the kiln, the oxygen-starved flames drew oxygen molecules from the iron oxide of the pottery. This process caused the fabric of the clay to change color from its natural red to black. Thus, in contrast to the black-glazed Campanian ware of the Greek colonists in southern Italy, the lustrous, shiny, black surface of many bucchero pots was achieved by diligent burnishing (polishing) or, occasionally, through the application of a thin slip (clay emulsion).

== Etymology ==
The term Bucchero derives from the Portuguese word búcaro, meaning "odorous clay", because this type of pottery was reputed to emit a special odor.

In the 18th and 19th century in Europe a lot of interest was shown for a particular type Pre-Columbian pottery in a black color. These ceramics were therefore shipped in large numbers from South America to Europe, where they were traded and were imitated.

At the same time, in Italy, 'etruscheria' (Etruscan-style artefacts) was in large demand and major digs were organized in Tuscany and Umbria in the quest for Etruscan antiquities. Because of the similarities with the popular South American ceramics, the striking black pottery that was found in Etruscan tombs was called 'bucchero'. This Italianate form became established in archaeological terminology and even today the designation 'bucchero' is still common in the scientific literature.

== Development ==
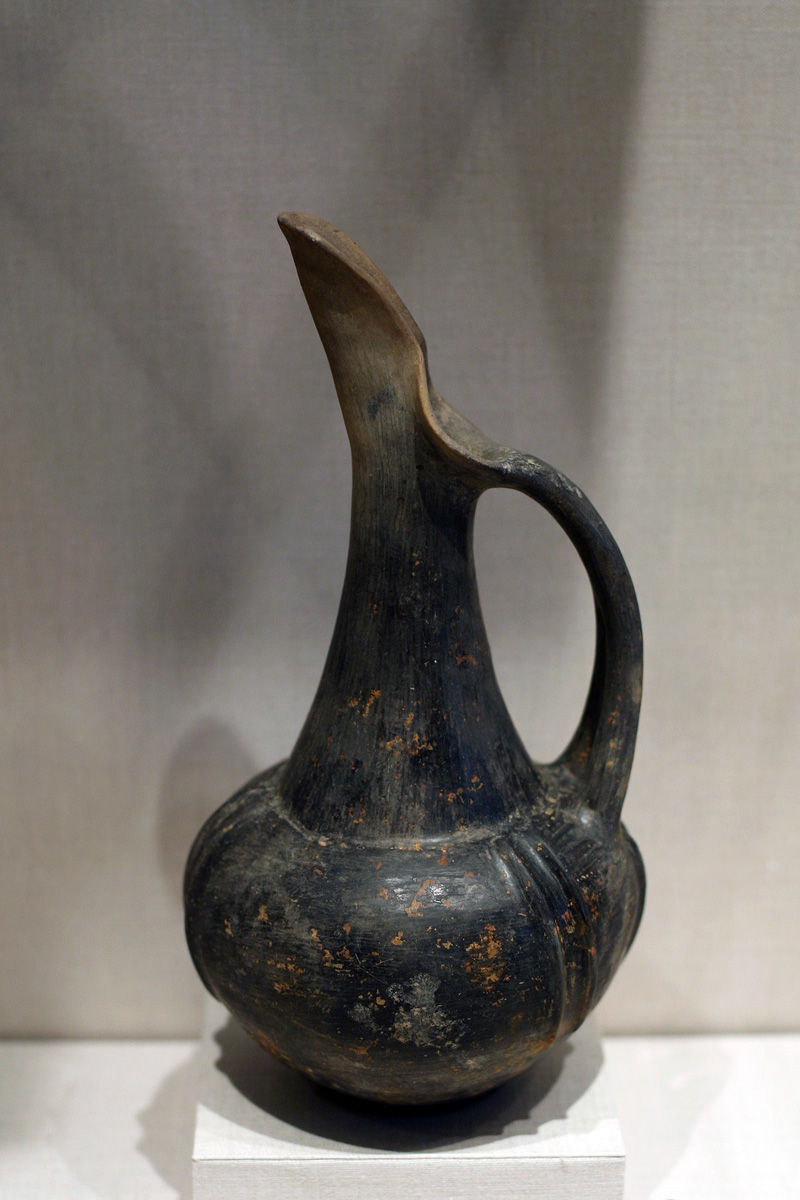
Oinochoe from the Metropolitan Museum of Art (inv. 91.1.454)

The first appearance of a ceramic type that can clearly be classified as bucchero occurred around 675 BCE at the coastal community of Caere (the modern-day Cerveteri), with somewhat later centers of production to be found at Veii and Tarquinia, both cities, like Caere, located in the southern part of the Etruscan heartland. Bucchero ware would seem to have been the natural sequel to the impasto pottery associated with the earlier Villanovan culture from which the Etruscan civilization, itself, had evolved. Etruscan pottery is distinguished from Villanovan impasto by the more sophisticated processing of the clays used which were finely levigated to remove the traces of grit common in the earlier pottery, by its being uniformly turned on a potter's wheel, by its carbonized black fabric in contrast to the brown or tan color found in impasto pottery.

Although the shapes of Villanovan pots provided the basics for the Etruscan potters, they added new types and forms largely inspired through intensified trade with the more advanced cultures at the eastern end of the Mediterranean, in particular the areas of Cyprus, Syria, and Phoenicia, as well as Egypt. Many of the new, exotic shapes were in imitation of the metalwares imported from these cultures. The potters of Etruria were able to offer their customers a locally produced and less-expensive ceramic equivalent to the desirable but costly metal products arriving from the east. Some of the Etruscan potshops even carried metalware imitation to the point of covering the surface of bucchero vessels with thin sheets of silver in an attempt to visually duplicate the luxurious imports.

== Styles ==
The Orientalizing manner is most apparent in the earliest phase of bucchero production which also is distinguished by the remarkable thinness of the walls of the vessels. Known as bucchero sottile, or delicate bucchero, this ware represents a technical achievement elevating the potters who turned them to the ranks of the very finest ceramicists. So thin-walled are some of bucchero sottile vessels (in some cases, less than 2mm in thickness), such as the products of the Cornacchiola Tomb Potter of Caere, that it is probable that they were turned specifically for funereal purposes rather than for general household use. On the other hand, the broad distribution of bucchero sherds at ancient Caere, Veii, and Tarquinia and at other area sites points to less extreme examples of bucchero sottile as having had a more practical function in the daily life of the Etruscans.

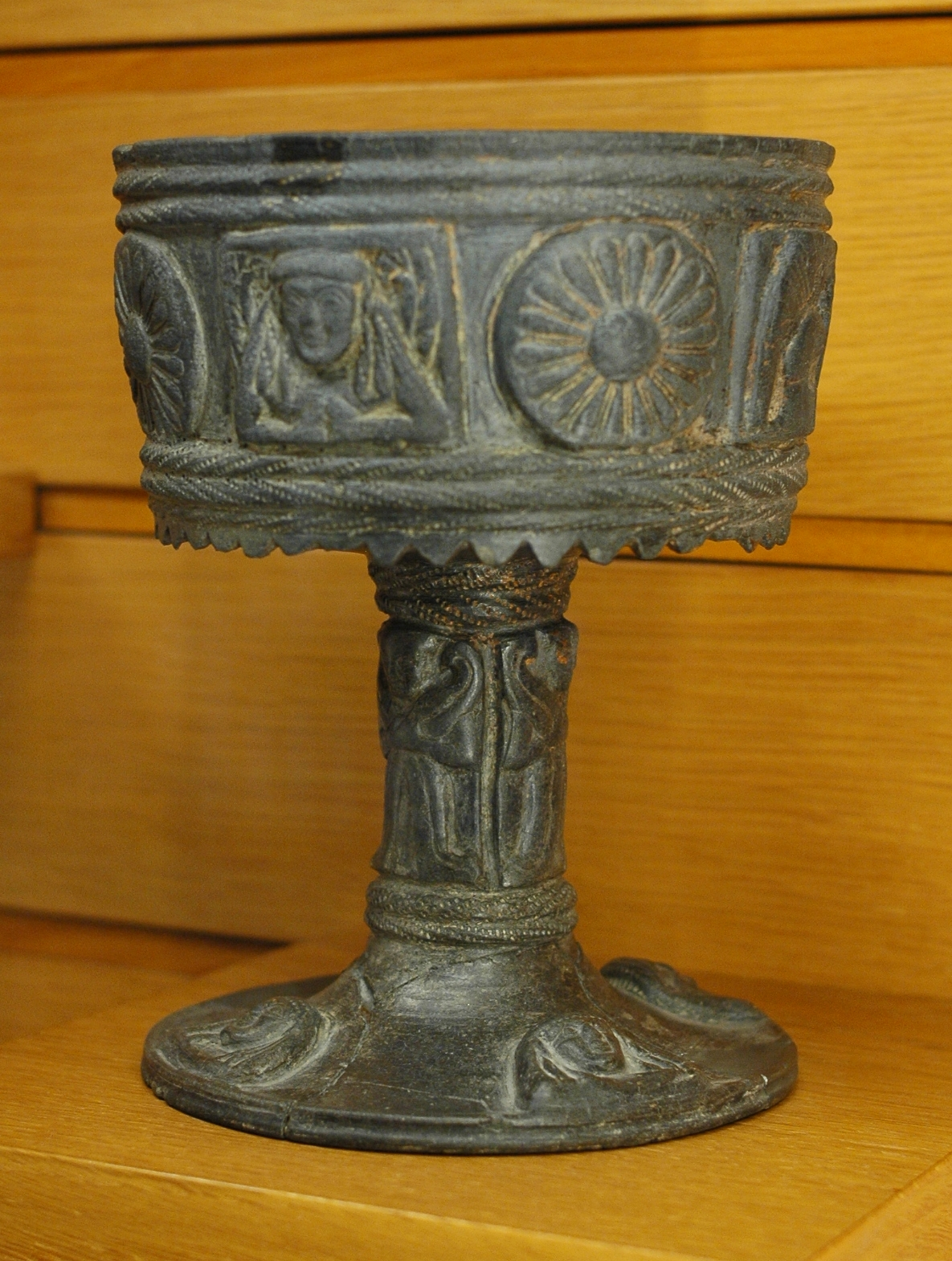
High-legged bucchero chalice with relief decoration, early 6th century BC (Louvre)

During the Archaic period, the ever-increasing impact of the Greek aesthetic on Etruscan culture can be noted in the influence of Greek vase shapes on the design choices of the bucchero potters. Etruscan potters, however, made their own contributions to the Hellenic ceramic vocabulary by adding the form of the two-handled drinking cup, the kantharos, and that of the related single-handled cup, the kyathos, to the list of Greek vase types. The Nikosthenic amphora with its wide, flat handles was yet another example of Greek potters looking to Etruscan prototypes. The bucchero wares of Etruria even offered some export competition to Greek pottery.

In the production of bucchero sottile, the shape of the pot held pride of place, with surface decoration playing a supporting role. When decoration was used, it was usually limited to enhancing the profile of a chalice, a kantharos, or a kyathos with a row of crisply defined hook notches at the point of carination. The bowl of an oinochoe (pitcher) might be emphasized by closely spaced vertical lines incised into the soft clay before firing. Further decoration could be added before the green ware was loaded into the kiln by using a toothed wheel or a comb-like instrument to create rows of dots arranged in fan patterns. On later examples a roller with recessed reliefs was used to transfer figures of deities or even narratives to the surface of the vessel.

During the Orientalizing period and on into the Archaic, bucchero sottile production continued but gradually lost its unique character as Etruria became increasingly Hellenized. As Rome began to nibble away at the territories of southern Etruria, centers for producing bucchero shifted northwards to the cities of Chiusi and Vulci. There, during the Classical period, potters put their stamp upon the bucchero tradition by introducing a new variety of the ceramic known as bucchero pesante, or heavy bucchero. In this final phase in the history of bucchero pottery, vessel walls become thicker and proportions squatter. The decoration of bucchero pesante ware typically consisted of mold-formed figures applied to the still-damp surface of the pot. By the beginning of the fifth century B.C.E., in part due to the growing availability of the elegant pottery of Greece, the demand for native bucchero ware was in a steep decline. Bucchero no longer was exported and, at home, consumers preferred the colorful pottery of the Greek artisans with their narrative and figurative panels. Etruscan potters now devoted their attention to the production of provincial imitations of Greek red-figure vases.

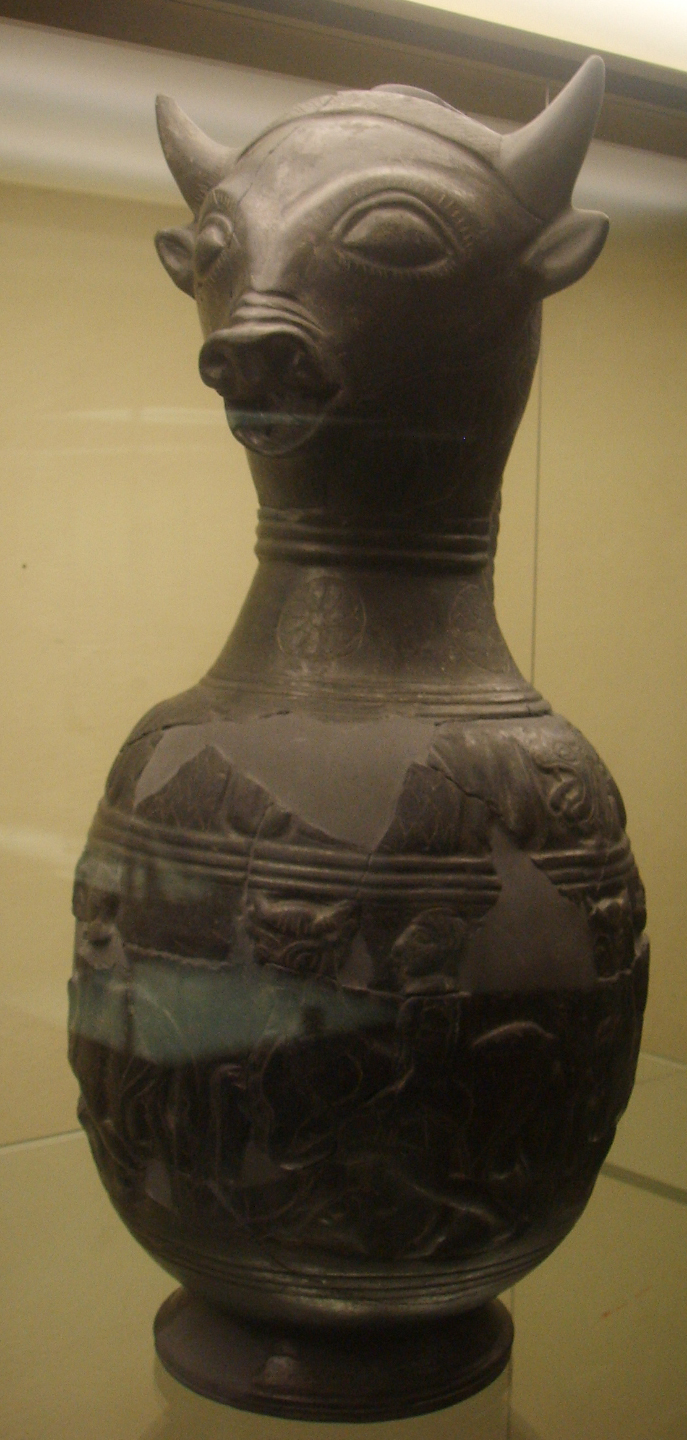
Bull-headed oinochoe (Chiusi, 6th century BC)

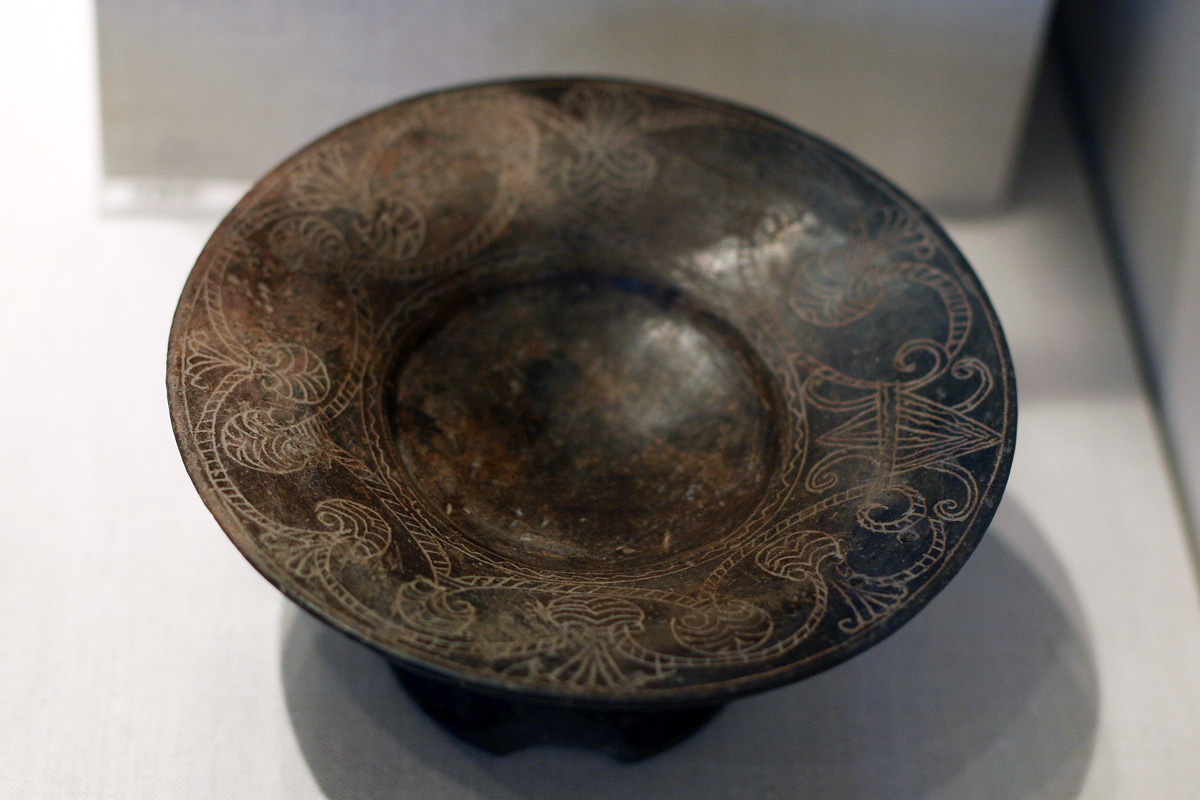
Plate (Metropolitan Museum of Art)

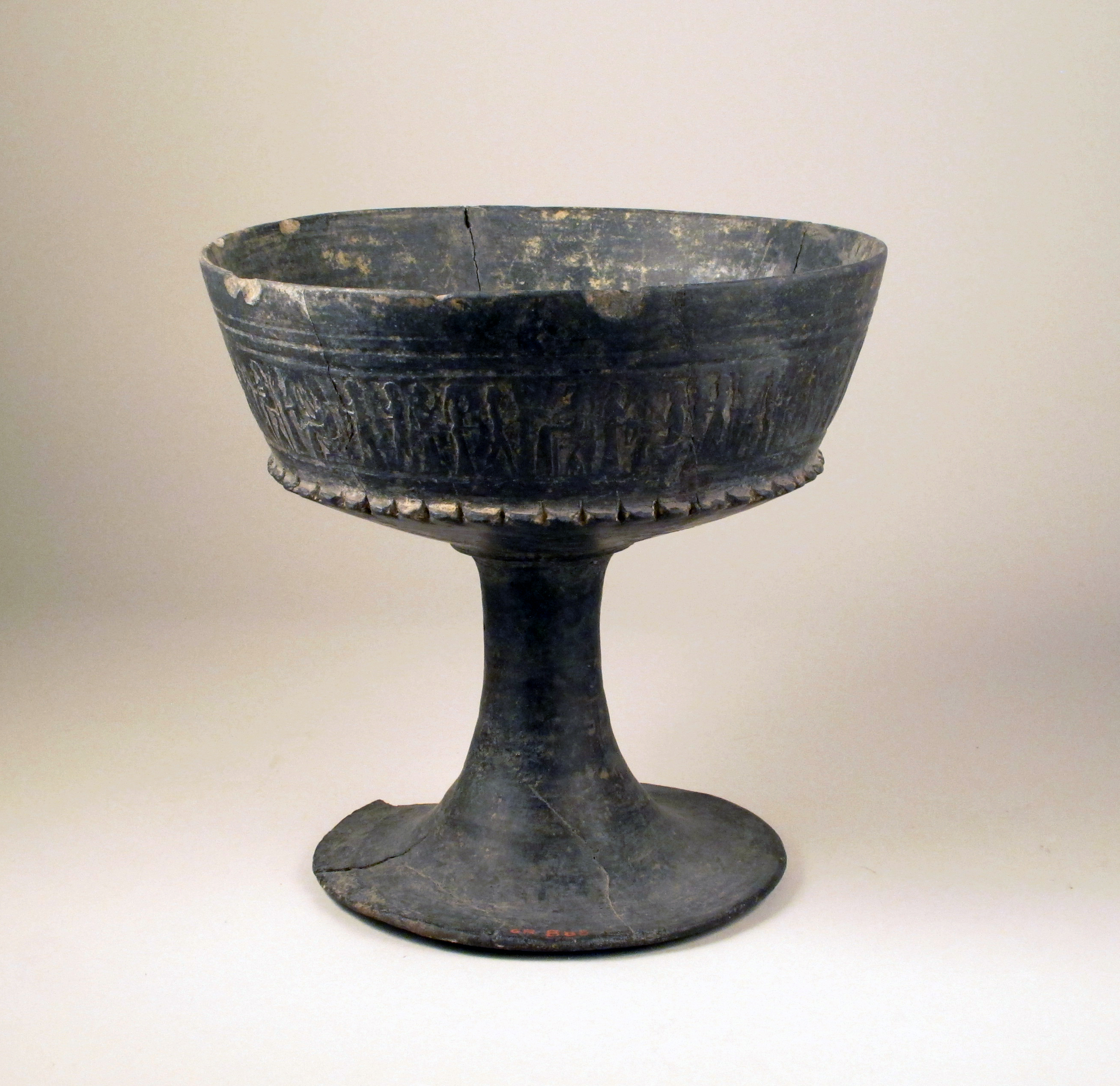
Cup banded with human and animal figures, first half of 6th century BCE

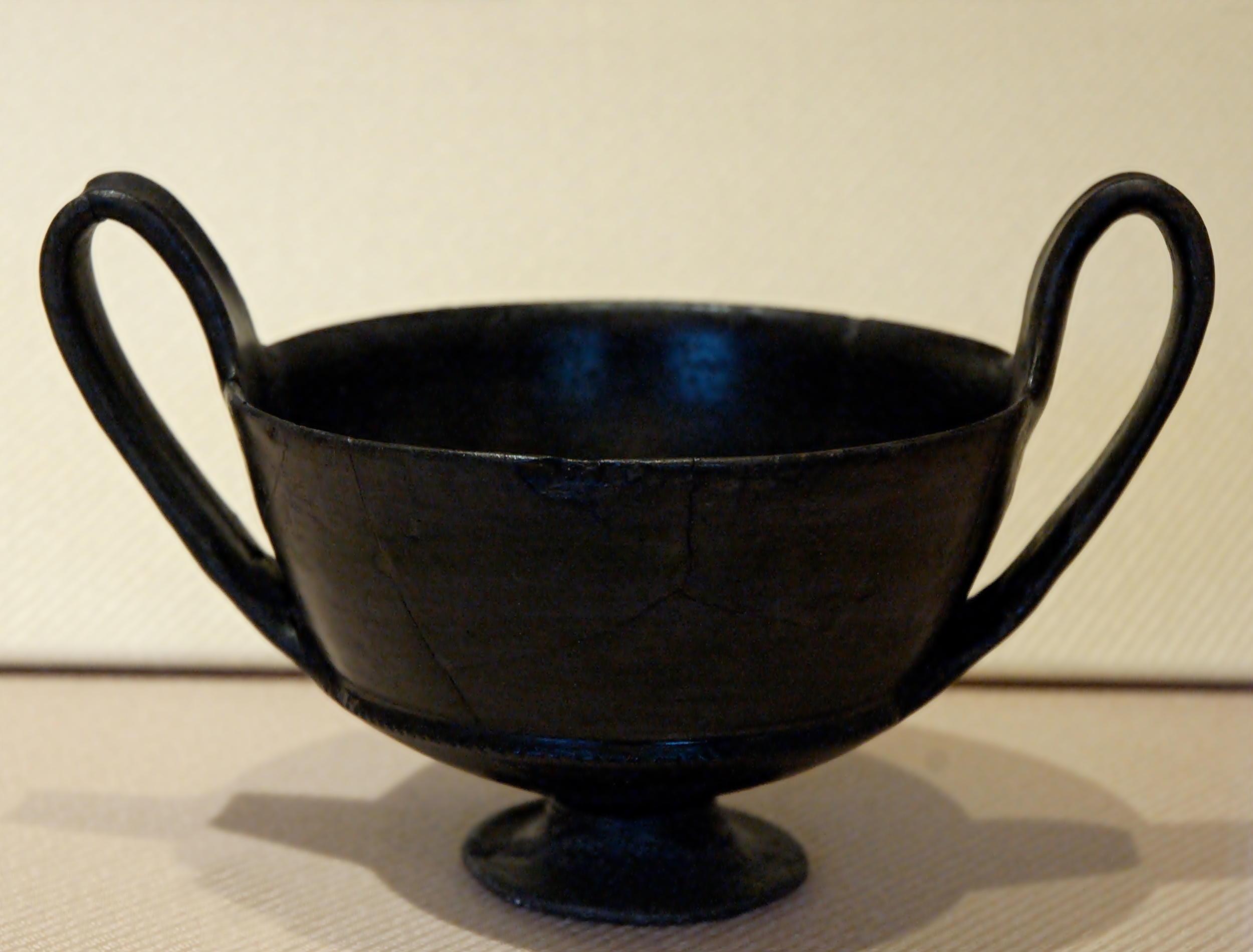
Kantharos (3rd or 4th Latial Period, cemetery at Osteria dell'Osa)

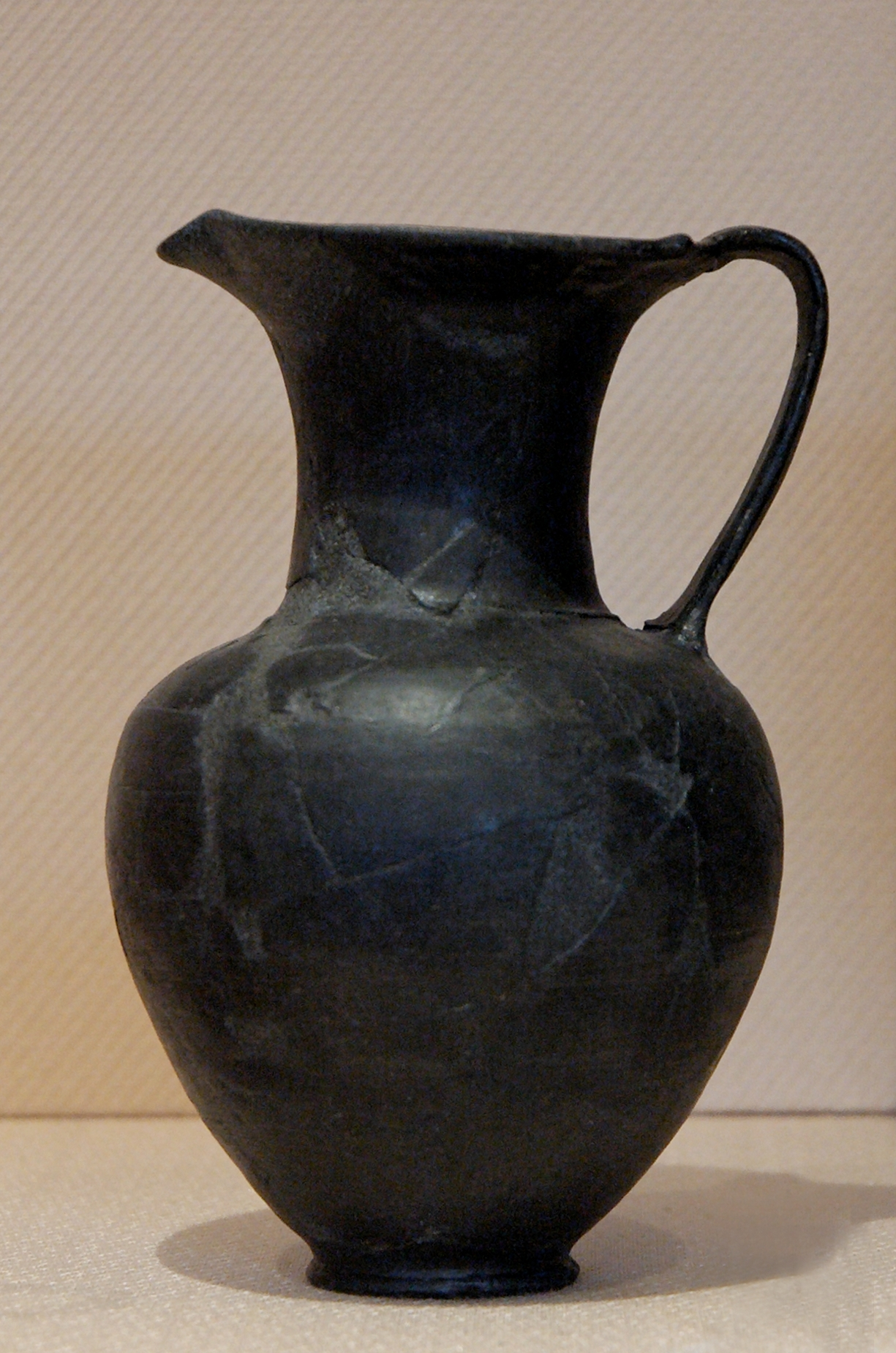
Oinochoe from the same site

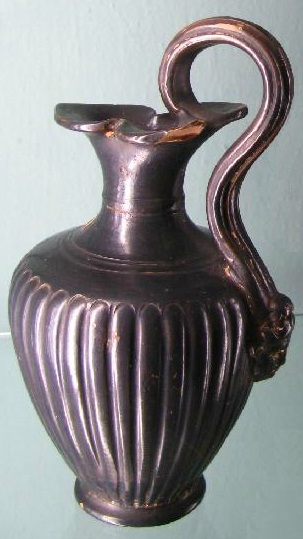
Oinochoe (latter 4th century BC, Volterra)

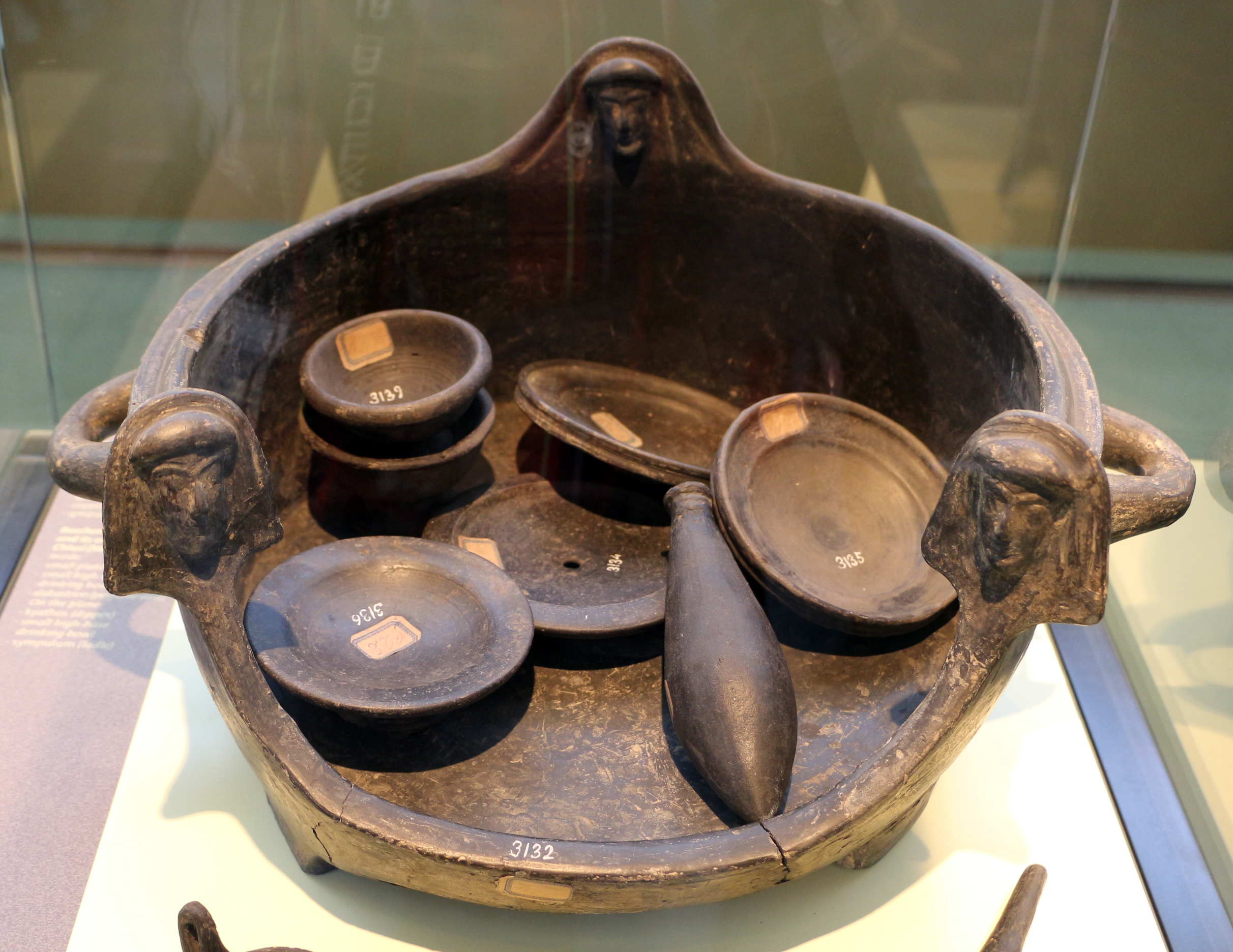
Etruscan Bucchero Focolare (funerary offering tray) from Chiusi A Tomb Group 550-500 BCE at the Art Institute of Chicago

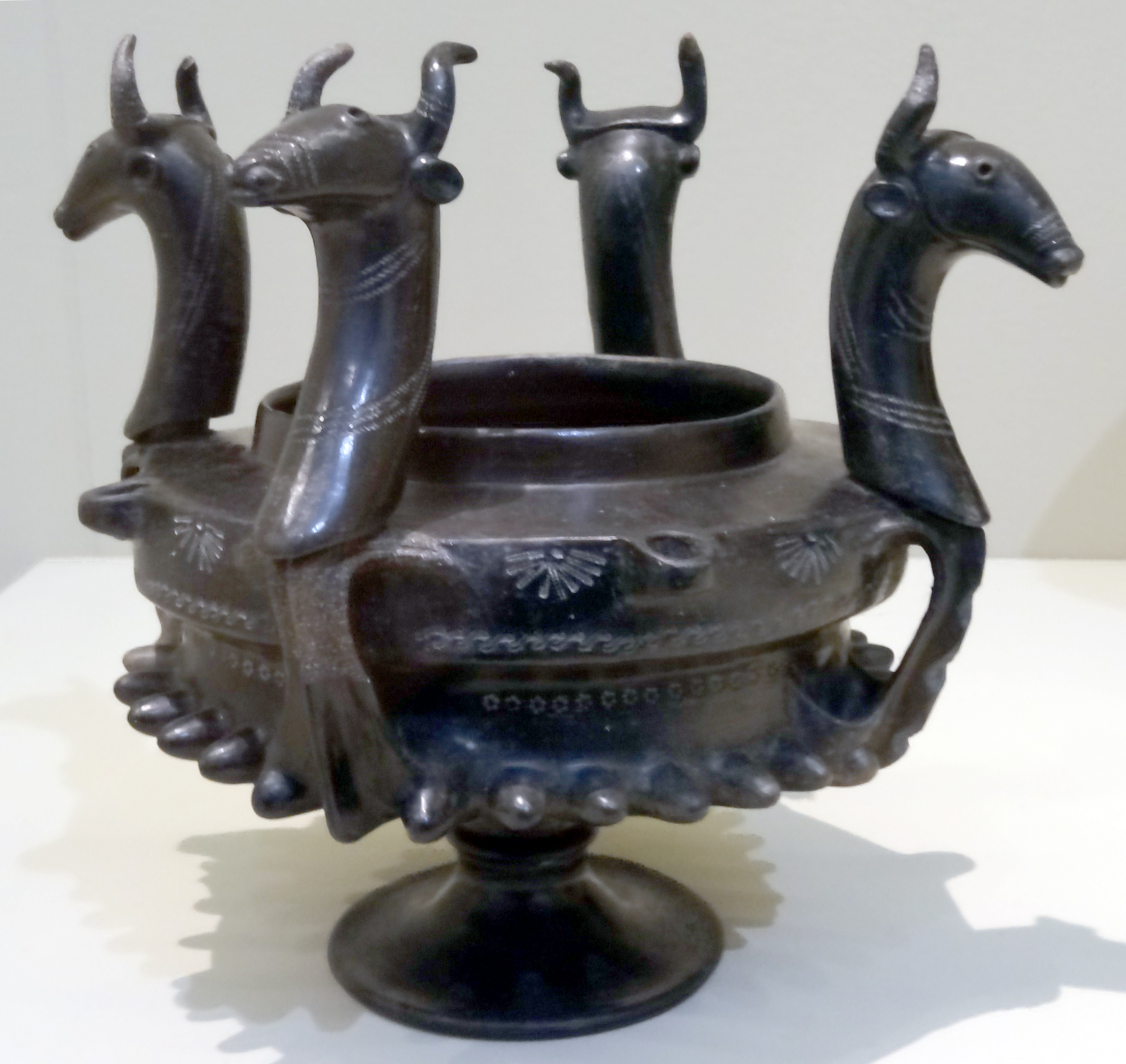
Etruscan offering vessel with bovine protomes at the Gregorian Etruscan Museum

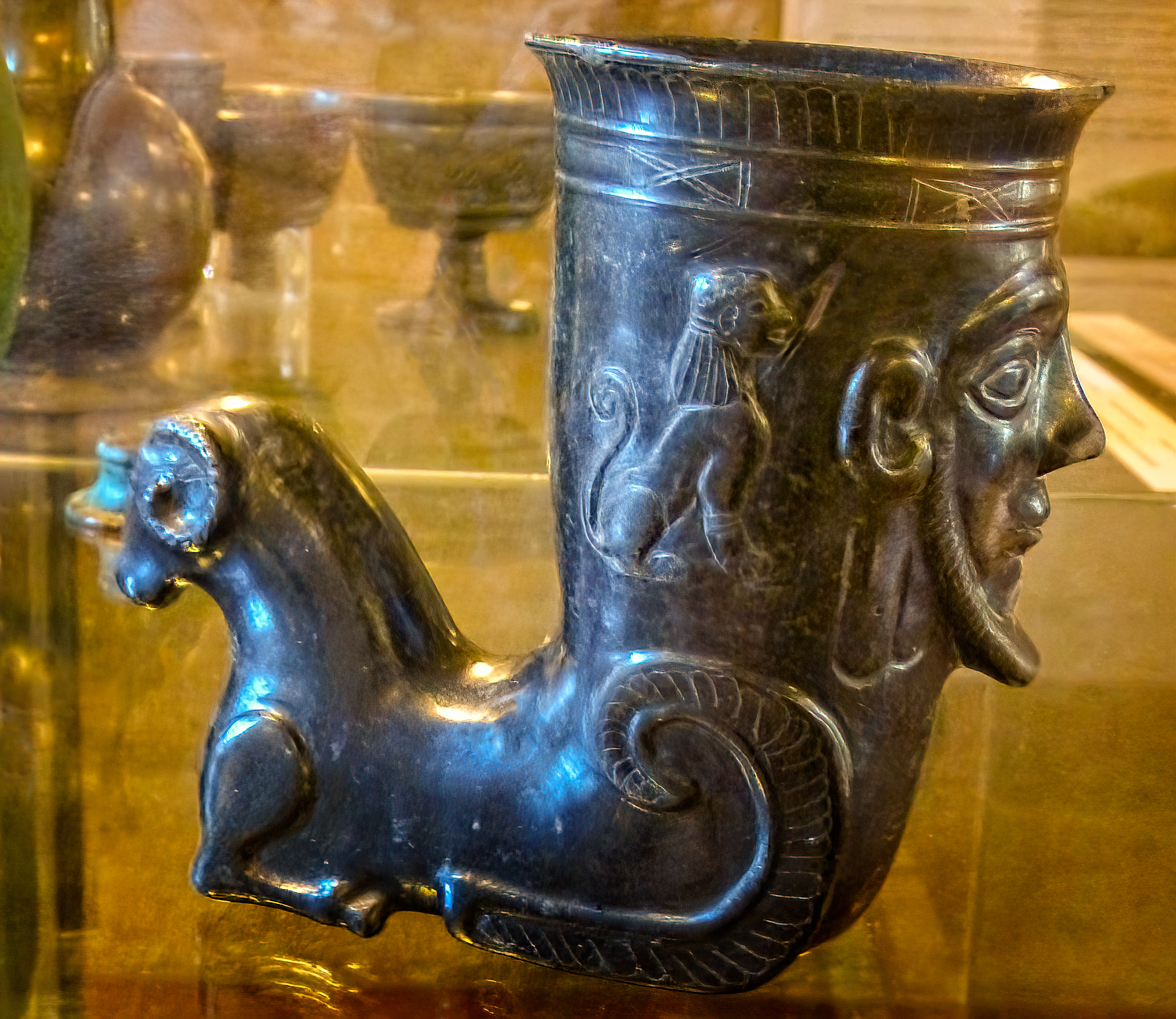
Bucchero rhyton from the necropolis of Cucifisso del Tufo at the NAM Orvieto 6th century BCE

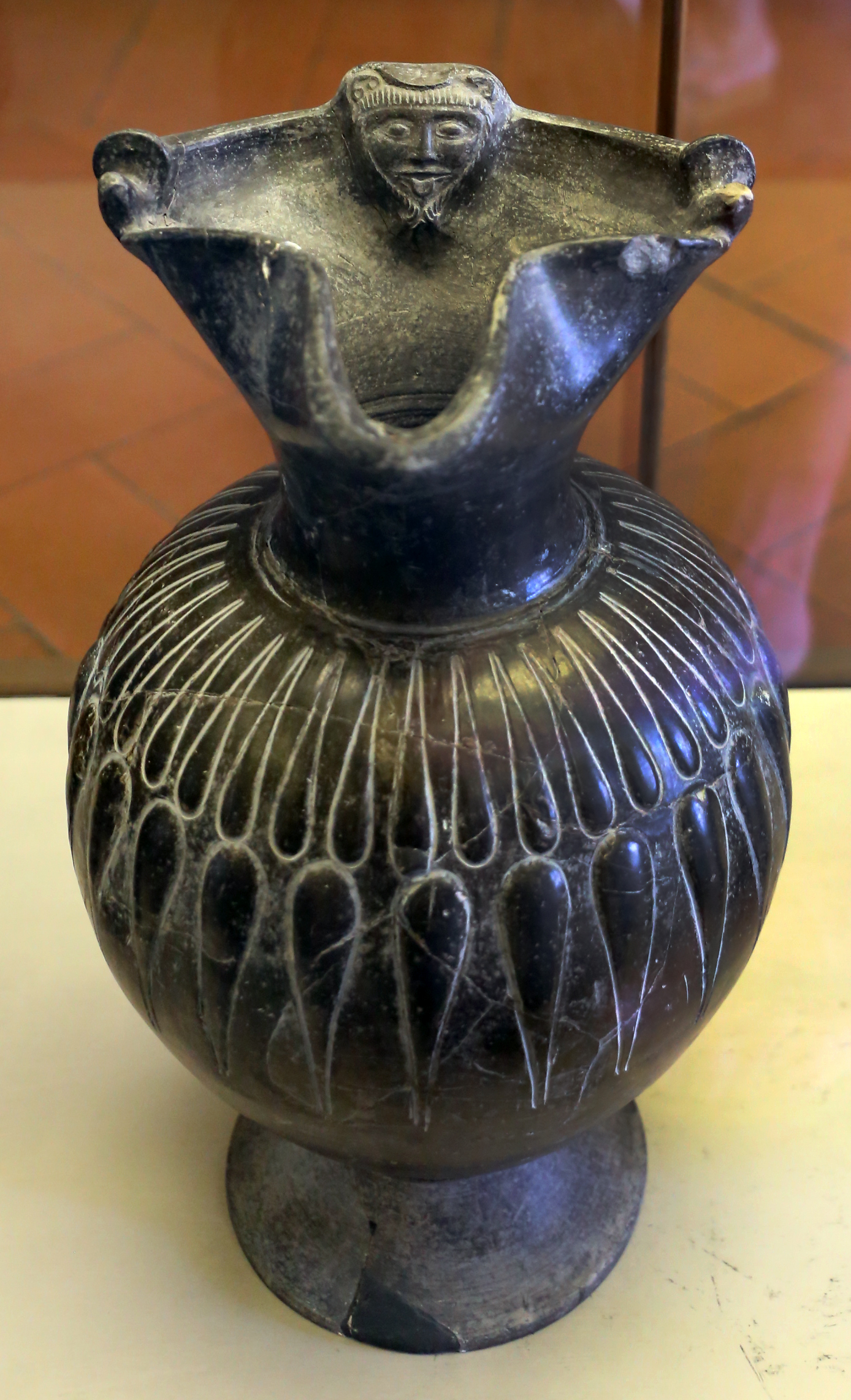
Oinochoe with mold decoration, 550-500 BCE

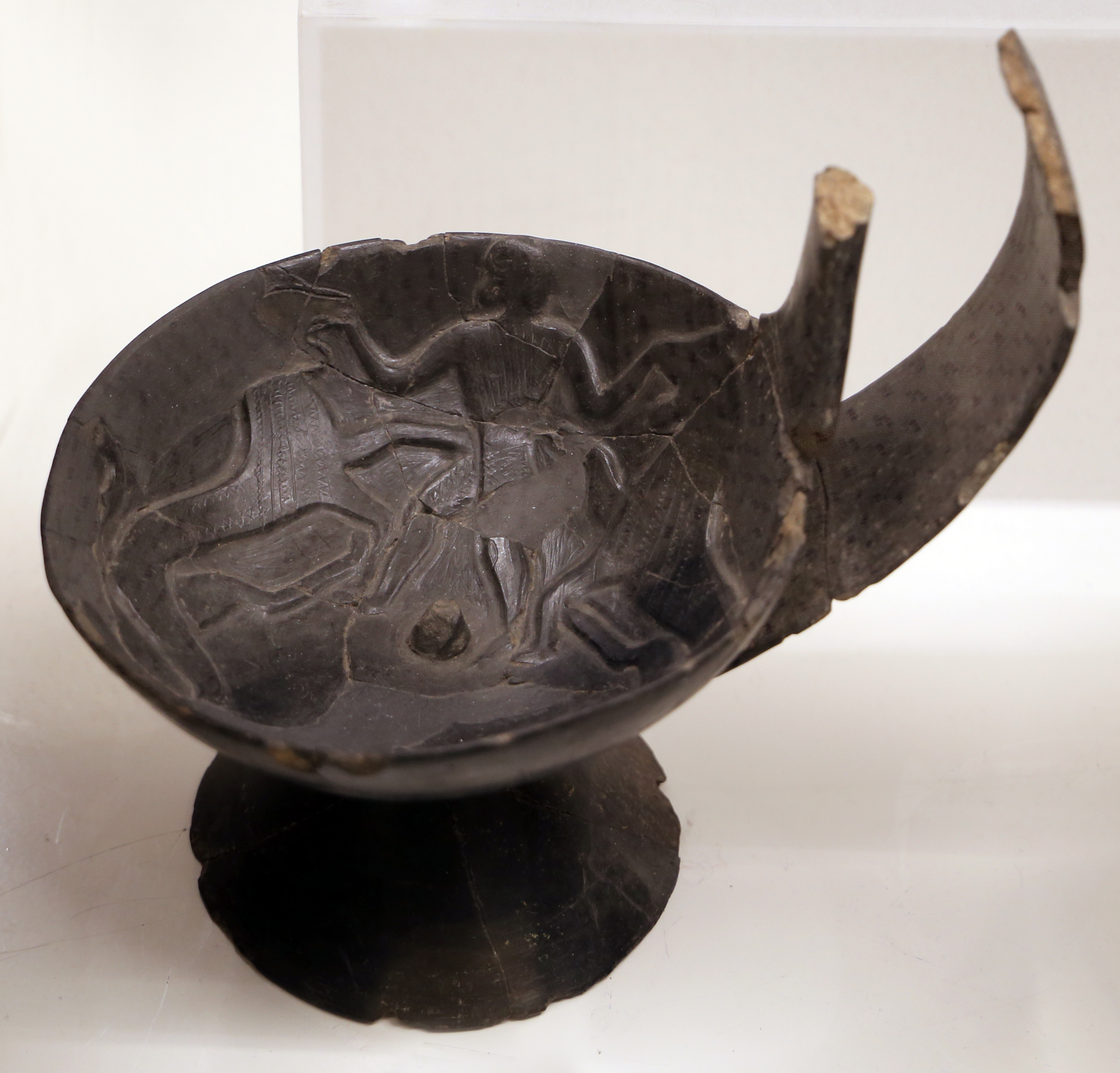
Kyathos in bucchero with man among lions, from tomb 1 of the mound of S. Paul, 670-650 BCE now National Etruscan Museum in the Villa Giulia in Rome

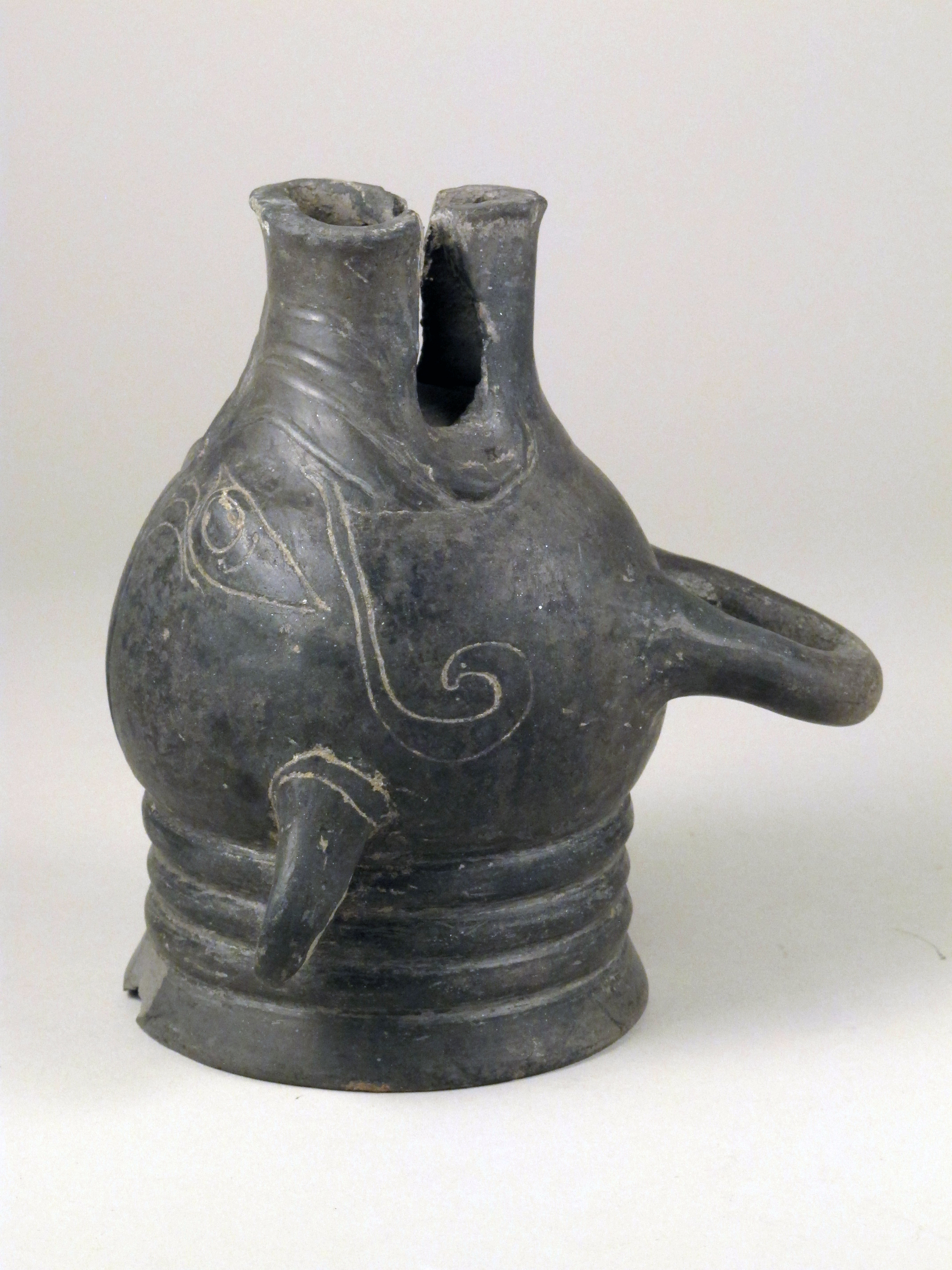
Etruscan cup in the form of a pig at the Metropolitan Museum of Art
