= BMN =

BMN may refer to:

- Beijing Media Network, a television network in China
- Bloc of National Minorities, a political party in the Second Polish Republic
- the ISO 639-3 code for the Bina language (Papua New Guinea)
- the National Rail station code for Bromley North railway station, London, England
- BMN Painter, an Attic vase painter active during the 6th century BC
