= Anakles =

6th-century B.C. Greek vase-painter

Anakles was a 6th-century BC Greek vase-painter whose work was closely associated with that of Nikosthenes, with whom he may have been in partnership.

== See also ==
- List of Greek vase painters
