= Theseus Painter =

Name referring to unknown vase decorator

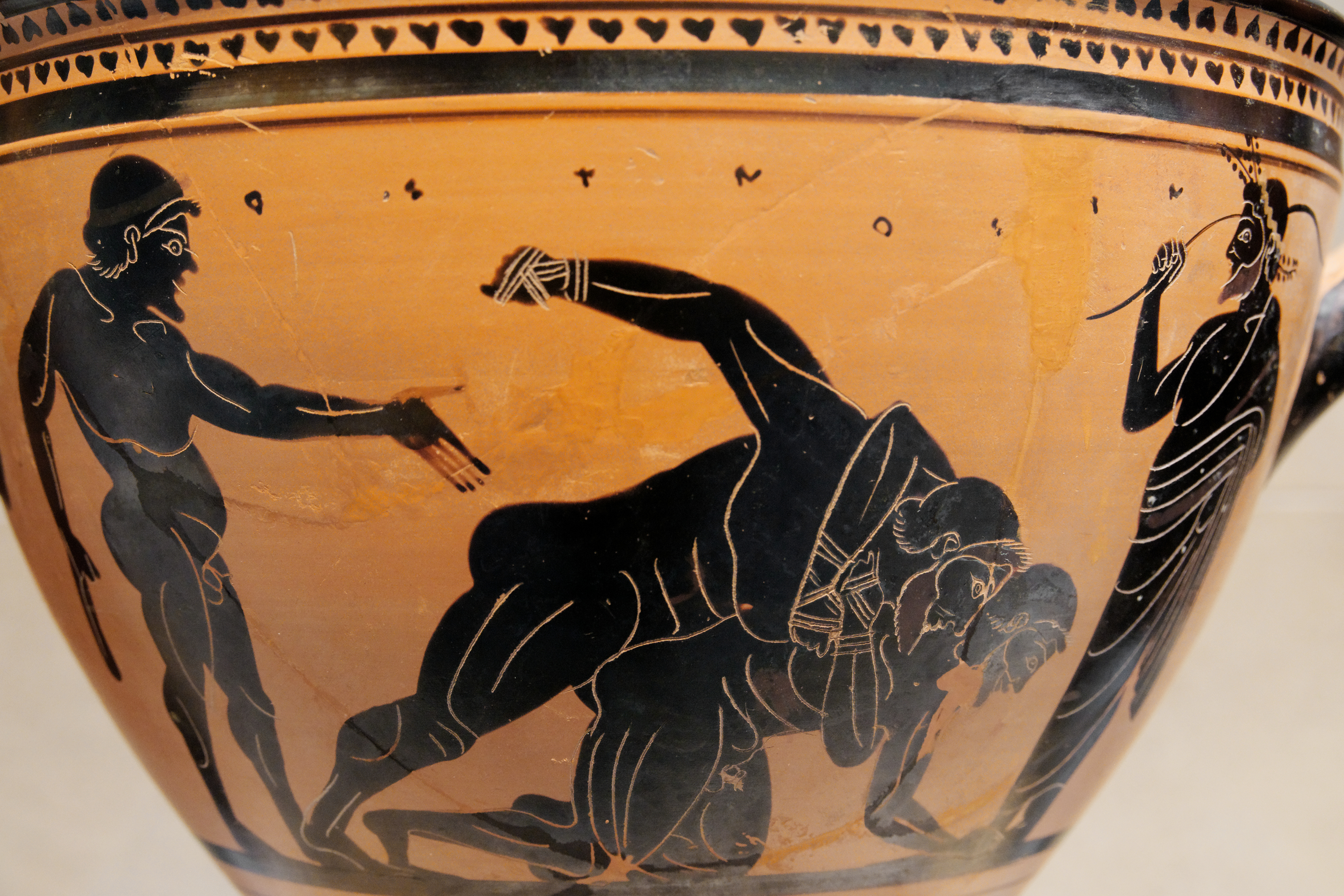
An Attic black-figure skyphos attributed to the Theseus Painter, c. 500 BCE. Metropolitan Museum of Art.

The Theseus Painter was a decorator of vases in the black-figure style, active in Attica c. 515 to 475 BCE. He was the leading producer of larger Heron Class skyphoi.

== Life and work ==
The true name of the Theseus Painter and the circumstances of his life have not been preserved. He is conventionally called the Theseus Painter because of the frequency with which he and his followers depicted various episodes of the Theseid, the peregrinations of Theseus.

Stylistic evidence indicates that he was contemporaneous with and a "dominant influence" among the Sub-krokotos group, (Note: The followers of the so-called Krokotos Painter, whose name is derived from the Greek κροκωτός (krokōtos) (saffron-yellow dress robe). The female figures in his work often wear krokōtoi.) and was perhaps a student of Pamphaios. He established his own workshop in Attica with the Athena Painter, and together they specialized in the production of skyphoi, lekythoi, and oinochoai in the black-figure style.

Although the more fashionable red-figure style had largely displaced the black-figure style at the turn of the sixth century, his work nonetheless enjoyed a certain measure of popularity, being found as far afield as Thasos to the north, Cyrene to the south, Rhodes to the east, and the far coast of Italy and Sicily to the west. He was a prolific artist, and stood out among practitioners of the obsolescent black-figure style by virtue of his skilful and inventive work.
