= Athena Painter =

Unidentified ancient Greek vase painter

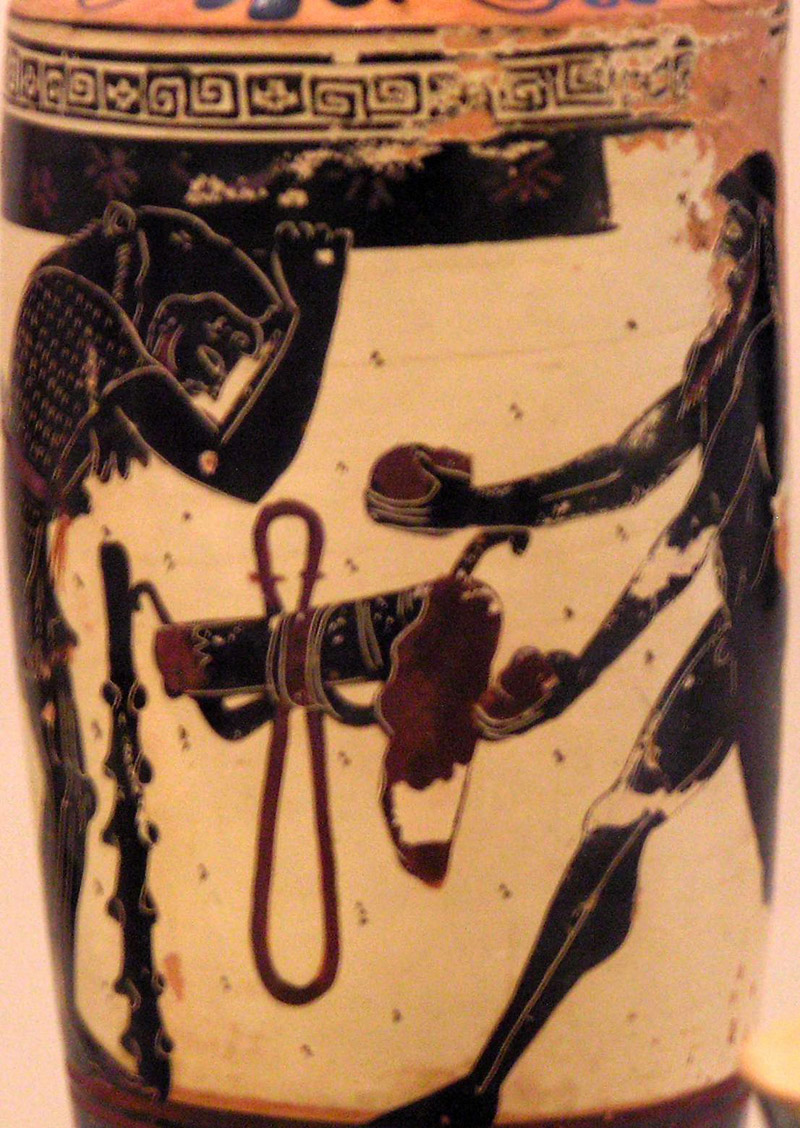
Heracles and Atlas, on a lekythos by the Athena Painter, c. 490–480 BCE, National Archaeological Museum, Athens.

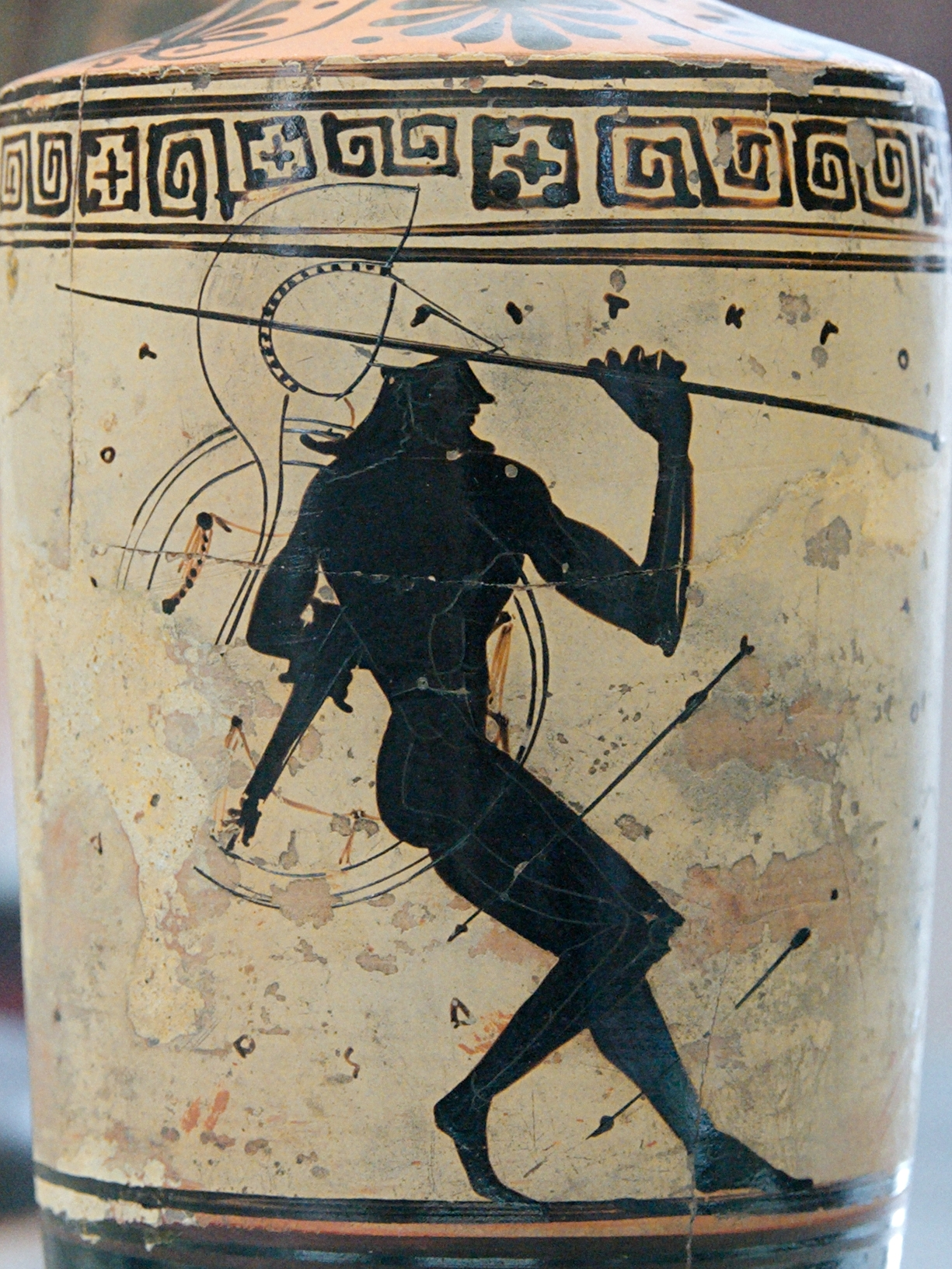
Warrior with shield and spear in a hail of arrows, white-ground lekythos with black-figure scene, c. 475/550 BCE, Paris: Cabinet des médailles.

The Athena Painter was an Attic black-figure vase painter, active about 490 to 460 BC. His speciality was white-ground lekythoi painted in the black-figure style.

His pseudonym, for his real name is unknown, refers to his preference for Athena in his choice of subjects. He was one of the last generation of black figure technique painters.

The Athena Painter, along with the Theseus Painter, continued the tradition of painting large standard lekythoi. His black-figure work was of high quality. Apart from lekythoi, he mainly painted oinochai. Some archaeologists identify him with the red-figure Bowdoin Painter. They may, however, simply have worked in the same workshop. His workshop was one of the production centres that developed the painting of white-ground lekythoi, which was to become especially important in the 5th century BC.

== See also ==
- List of Greek vase painters

== References and sources ==
Sources

- Beazley, J. D. (1956). Attic Black-figure Vase-painters (Oxford: Clarendon Press), pp. 522–524, 533, 704.
- Boardman, J. (1974). Athenian Black Figure Vases (London: Thames & Hudson), p. 113f, 147–149, figs. 250–255.
- John Boardman: Schwarzfigurige Vasen aus Athen. Ein Handbuch, Mainz 1977 (Kulturgeschichte der Antiken Welt, Vol. 1) ISBN 3-8053-0233-9, p. 160.
- Krannert Art Museum: White ground lekythos with the battle of Kaineus and the Centaurs
- C. H. Emilie Haspels: Attic black-figured lekythoi, Paris 1936, p. 41–165. 254–262
- Matthias Steinhart: Apollon auf dem Schwan. Eine neue Lekythos des Athenamalers, In: Archäologischer Anzeiger (1993) p. 201–212.
- Thomas Mannack: Haspels addenda: additional references to C. H. E. Haspels Attic black-figured Lekythoi. Oxford 2006. ISBN 0-19-726315-1, p.
