= Pamphaios =

Greek Attic potter active between 510 and 480 BC

Pamphaios was an Attic potter active around the end of the 6th century BC. Pamphaios was the successor of Nikosthenes in that artist's workshop, and thus took over from one of the most influential and creative potters of antiquity. He probably took over the workshop before 510 BC and continued the tradition of his predecessor by producing typical shapes the latter had developed, such as the Nikosthenic amphora, the Nikosthenic pyxis or the Chalkidian style cup. At times, he developed these shapes further. Unlike Nikostehenes, Pamphaios favoured painters of the red-figure style, which was at the time replacing the previously dominant technique of black-figure vase painting. He also continued to employ many of the painters that had worked for Nikosthenes, such as Oltos, Epiktetos and the Nikosthenes Painter.

Pamphaios signature survives on more than fifty vases – spelled different ways by various artists, it probably functioned as a trademark on his workshop's products.

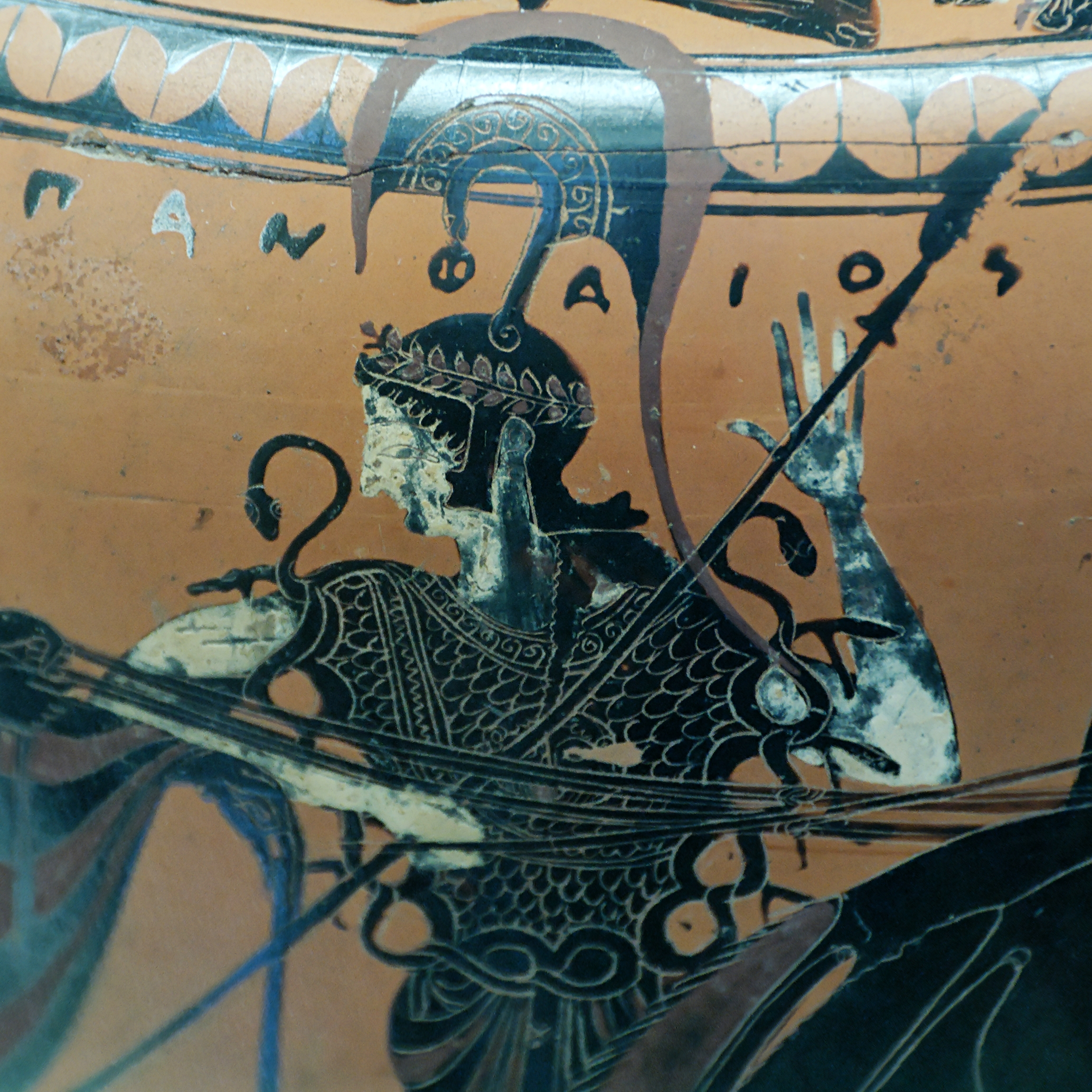
Attic black-figured hydria depicting Athena wearing the aegis.
Signed by the potter Pamphaios and the Euphiletos Painter c. 540 BC. Cabinet des Médailles, BNF, Paris

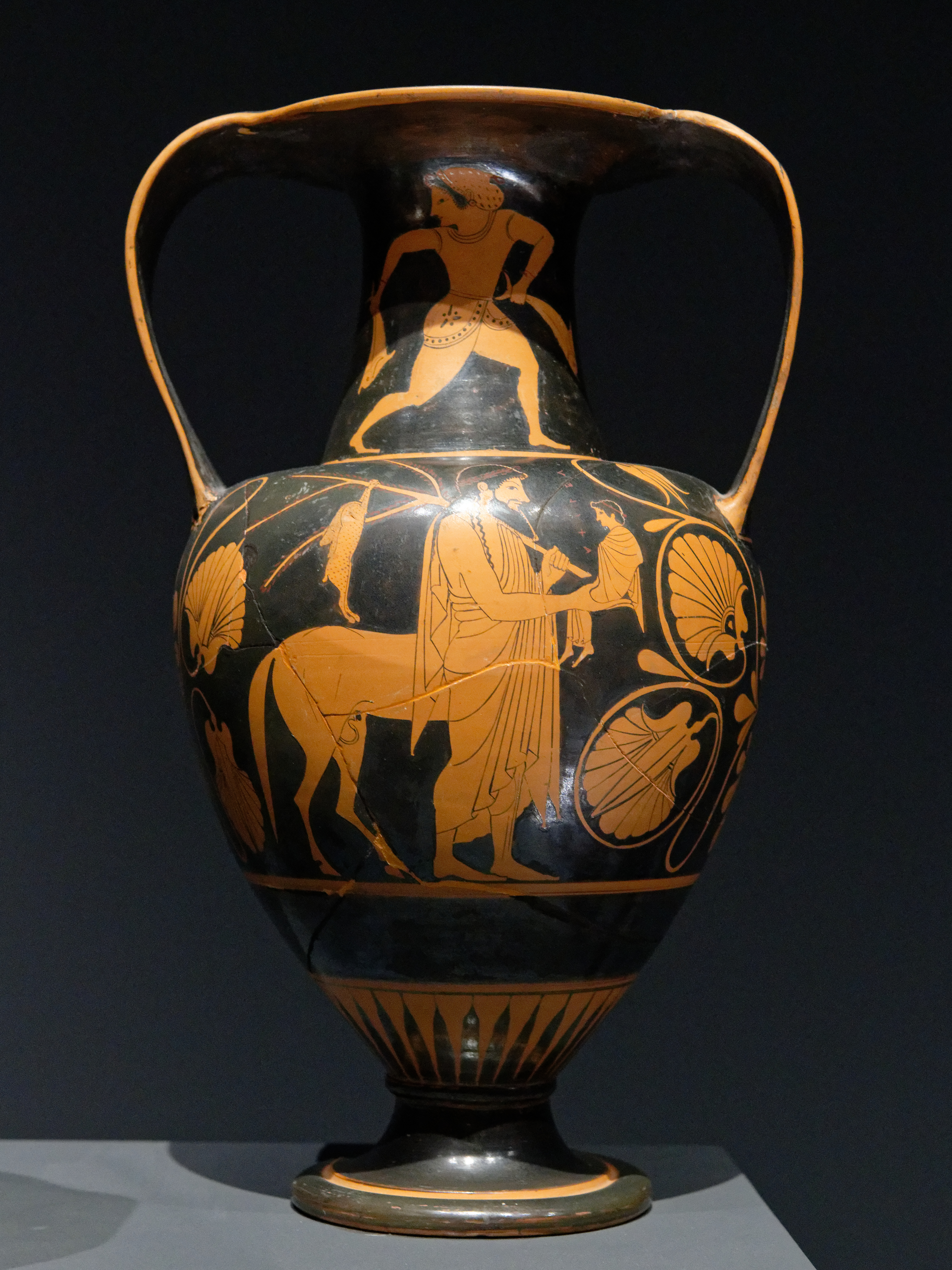
The centaur Chiron holding the child Achilles and a hare at the end of a stick, side B of a c. 525–515 BC red-figure Nikosthenic neck-amphora

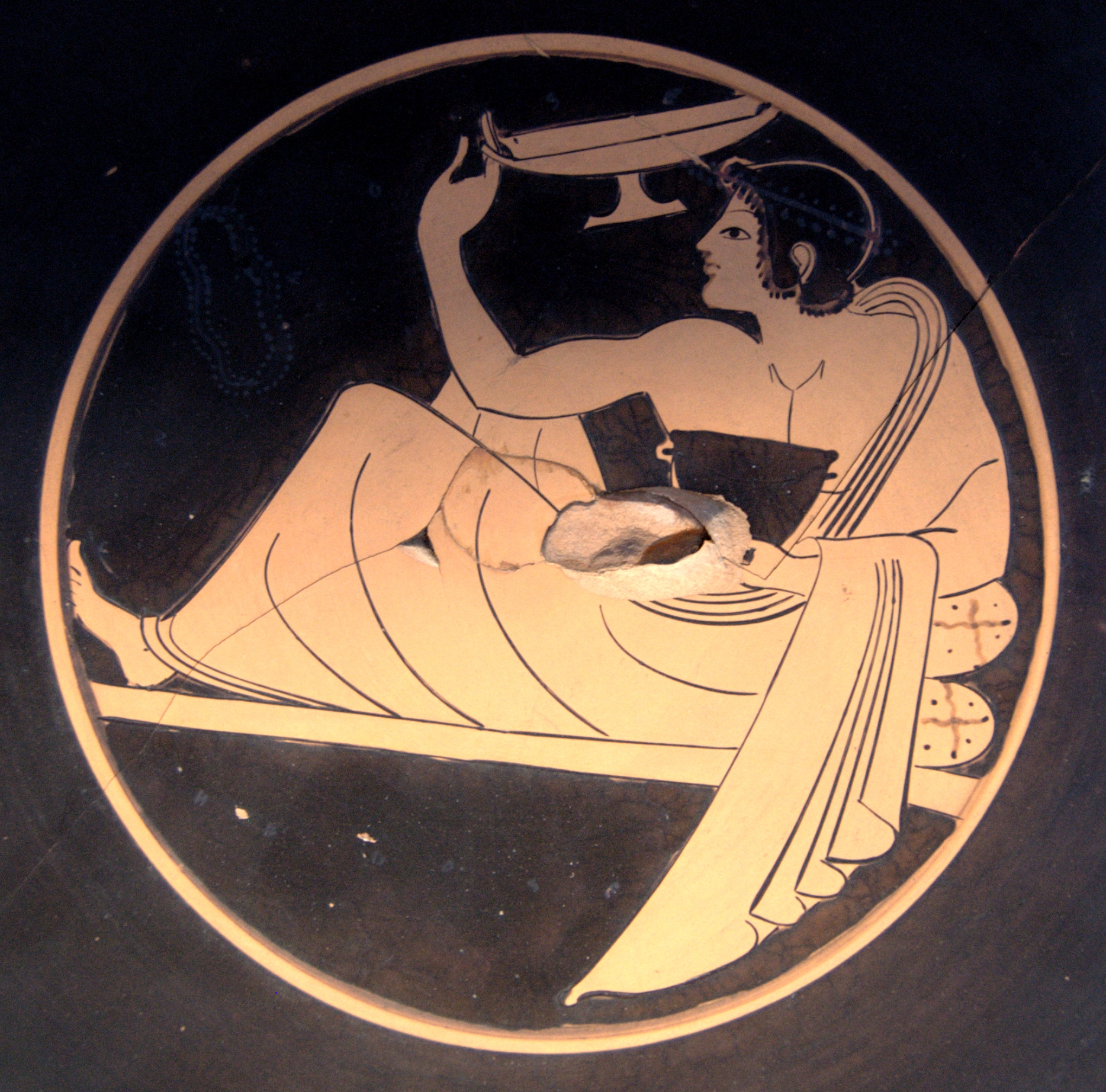
Interior of a red-figure kylix depicting kottabos players.
Signed by Pamphaios, c. 510 BC. Louvre (CA 1585).

== Bibliography ==
- John Beazley: Attic Black-Figure Vase-Painters, Oxford 1956, p.
- John Boardman: Schwarzfigurige Vasen aus Athen. Ein Handbuch, Mainz 1977, ISBN 3-8053-0233-9, p. 72 f., 116 f., 122
