= Euphiletos Painter =

Ancient Greek vase painter

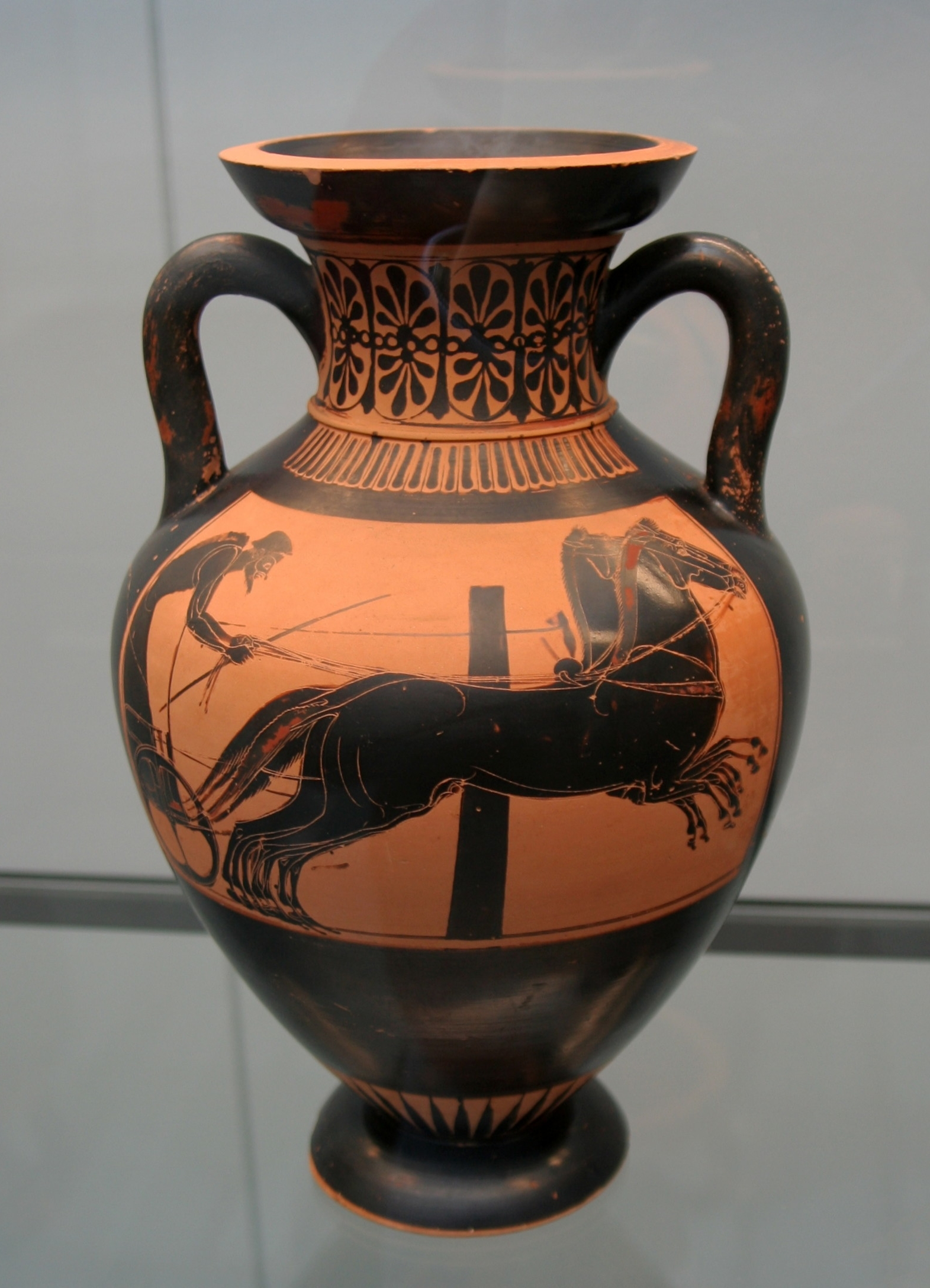
- Chariot race on a pseudo-Panathenaic prize amphora, dated circa 500 BC, by the Euphiletos Painter. Located in the Staatliche Antikensammlungen of Munich
- Born: Unknown; Before 550 BCE
- Died: No later than 500 BCE
- Known for: Vase painting
- Notable work: High-quality amphorae manufactured in collaboration with the potter, Pamphaios
- Movement: Black-figure technique

The Euphiletos Painter was an Attic black-figure vase painter active in the second half of the sixth century BC.

One of the better-quality vase painters of the black-figure style in Athens, he is known especially for his Panathenaic prize amphorae. In them, his work evinces a chronological development influenced extensively by red-figure vase painting, a style developing during his lifetime. While his early works show athletes in unrealistic stances, the quality of the depictions improved considerably over time, especially with regard to his increasing control of internal detail. This improvement is especially visible in human depictions and in shield devices. His work on vases other than prize amphorae is of lesser quality and often depicts the then-popular motif of chariot races. Most of his non-prize amphora work dates to about 520 BC, but some pieces are estimated to be up to 20 years earlier or later. He collaborated with the potter Pamphaios.

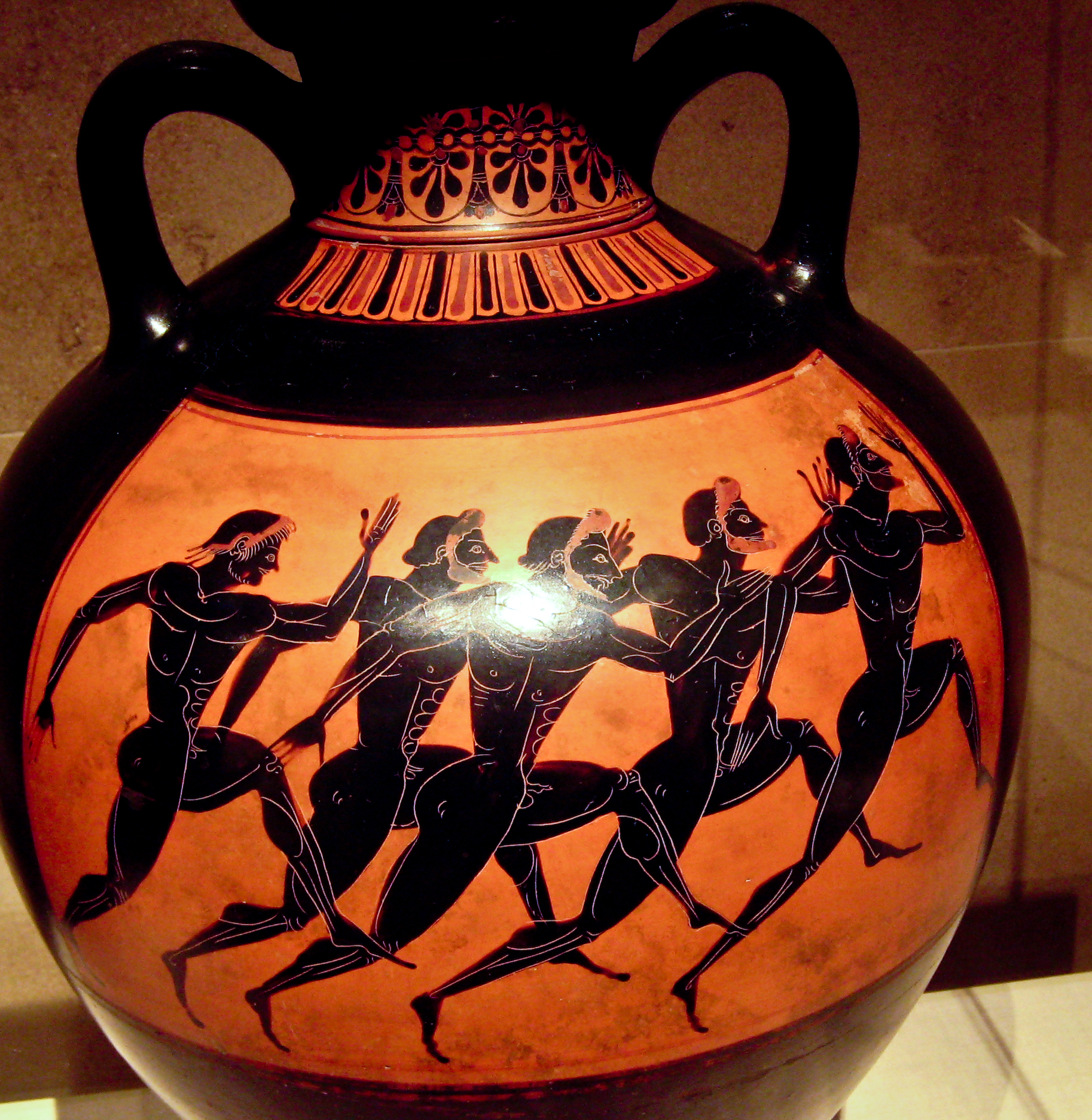
Panathenaic amphora showing runners, awarded to a victor in one of the Panathenaic Games, c. 530 BC. It would have been filled with oil from the sacred olive groves in Attica.
Metropolitan Museum of Art

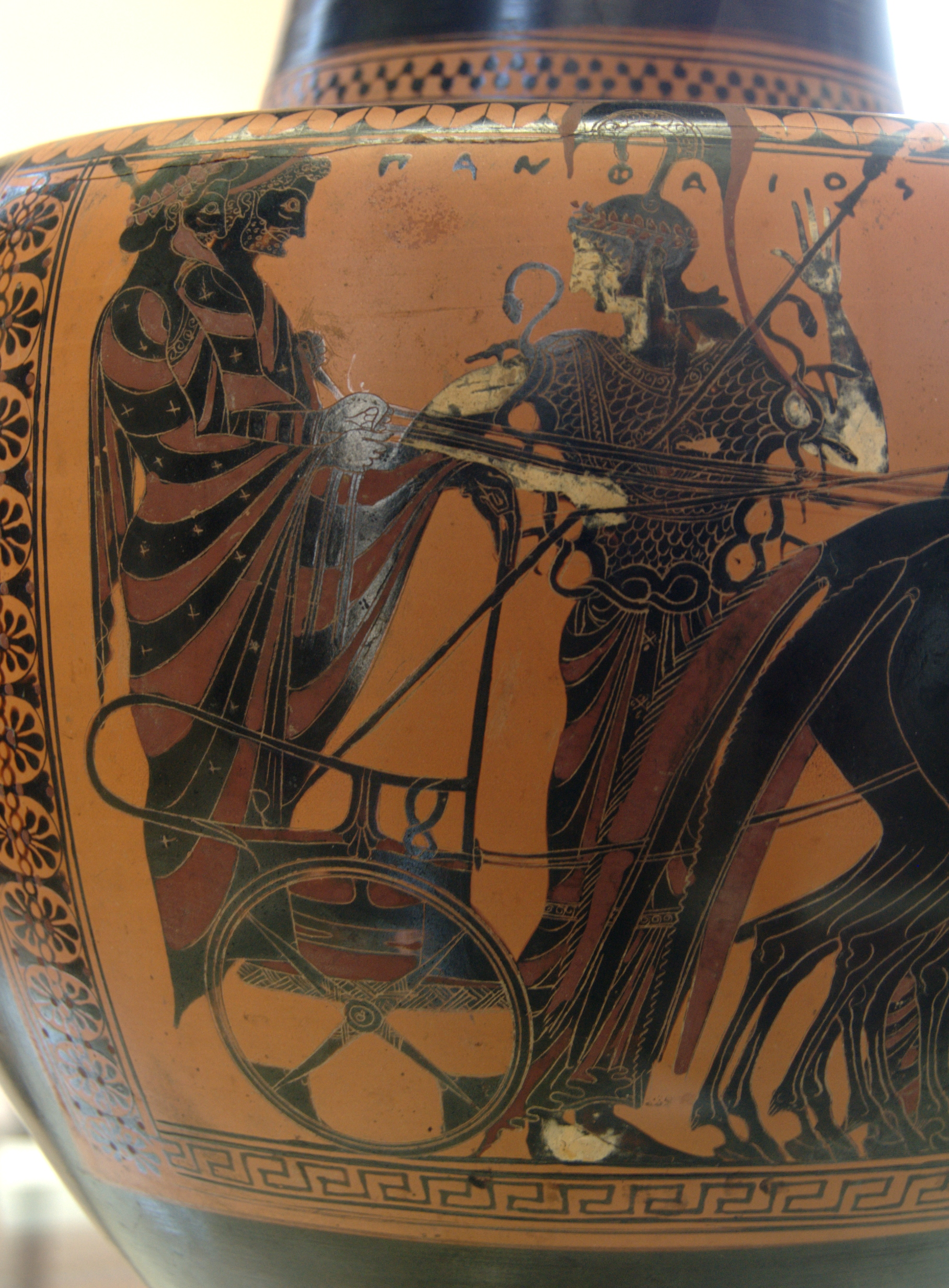
Herakles, Iolaos and Athena on a hydria, c. 540 BC
Cabinet des Médailles, BnF

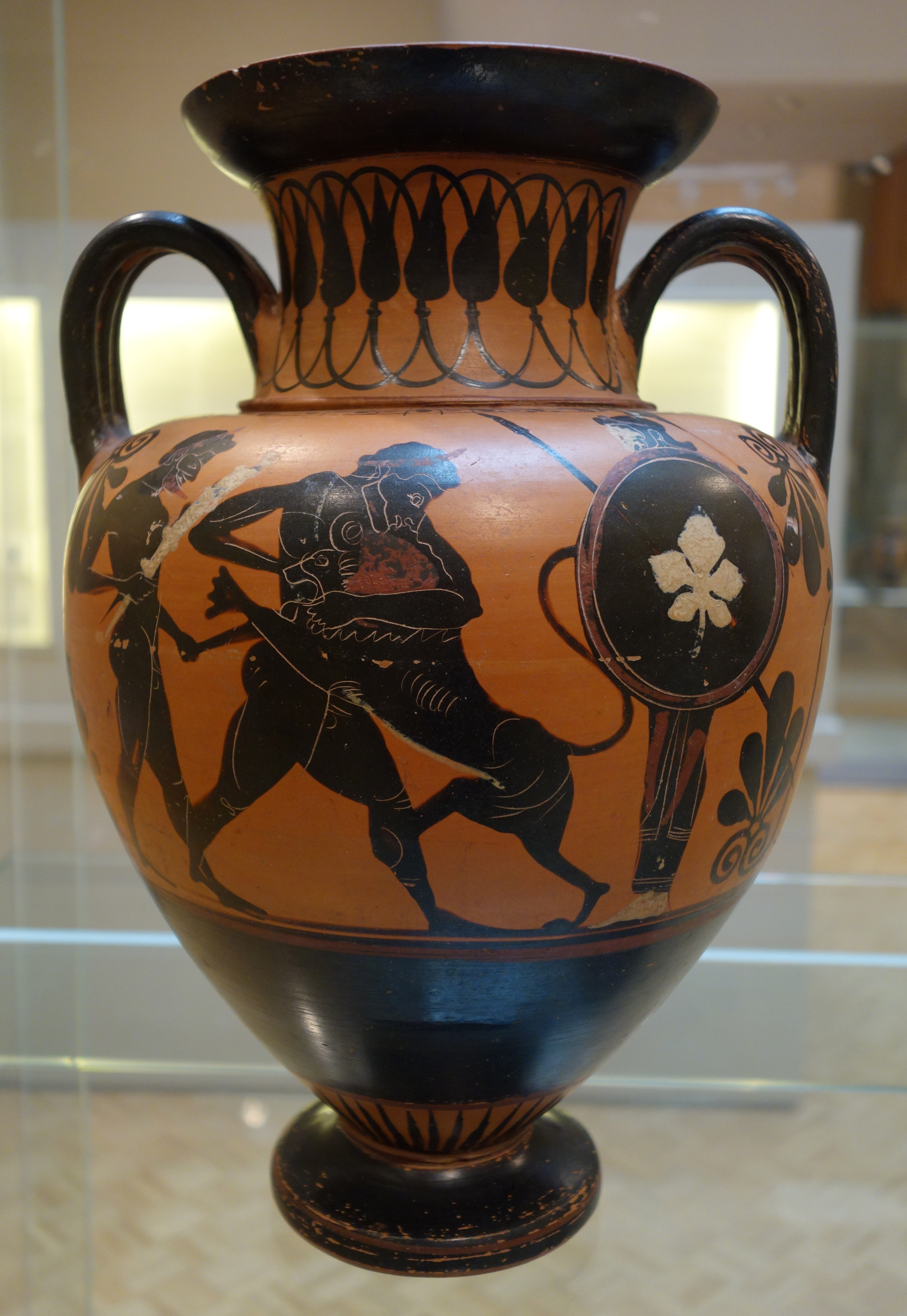
Neck amphora c. 530 BC, Side A (Herakles and Nemean Lion with Athena and Iolaos), Side B (Warrior and two horsemen).
Chazen Museum of Art

== Bibliography ==
- John Beazley: Attic Black-Figure Vase-Painters, Oxford 1956, p.
- John Beazley: Paralipomena. Additions to Attic black-figure vase-painters and to Attic red-figure vase-painters. Oxford 1971. p.
- John Boardman: Schwarzfigurige Vasen aus Athen. Ein Handbuch, Mainz 1977, ISBN 3-8053-0233-9, p. 123
