= BMN Painter =

Ancient Attic-Greek black-figure vase-painter

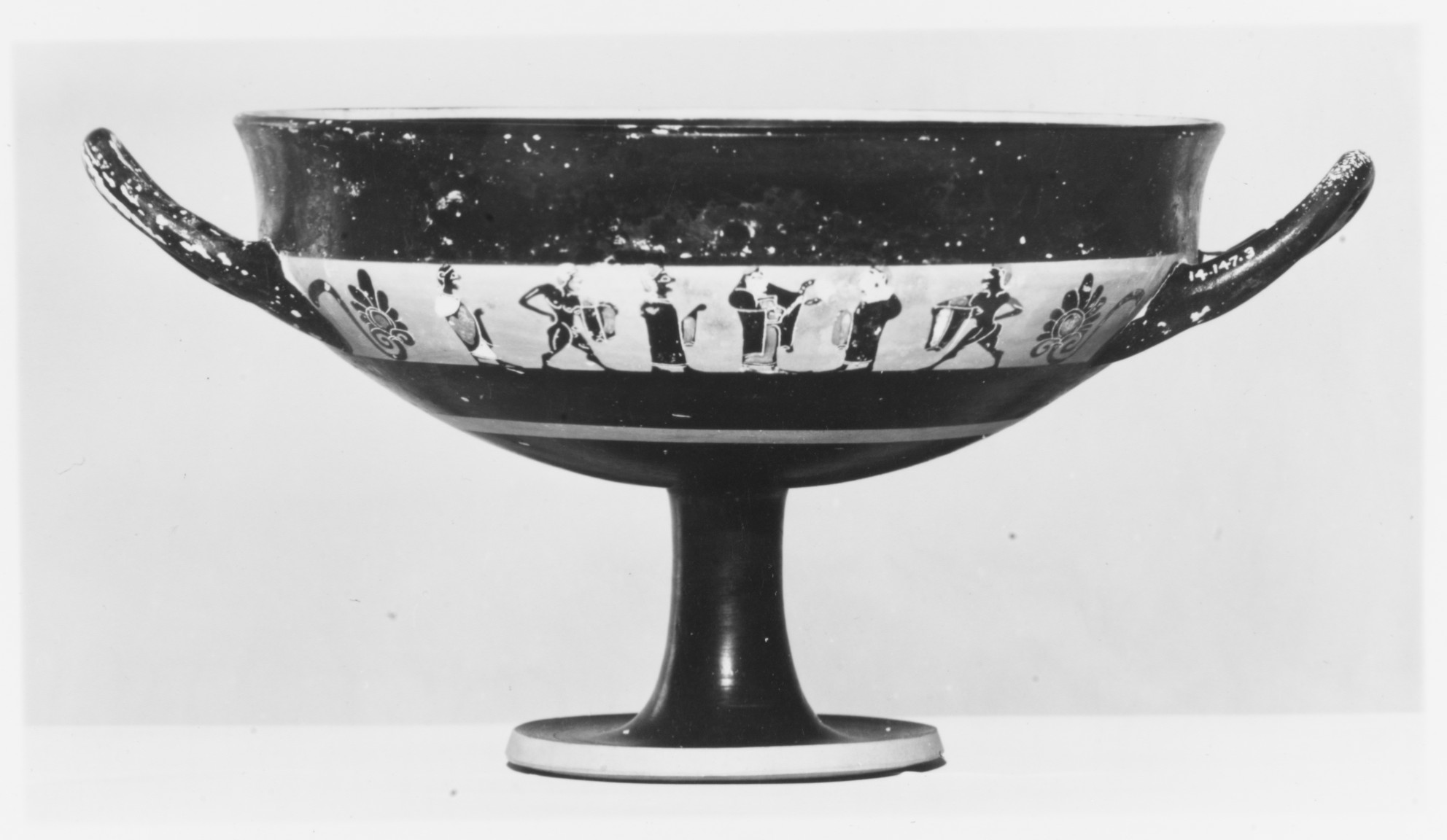
Band cup, Metropolitan Museum of Art (14.147.3)

The BMN Painter was an Attic vase painter in the black-figure style, active during the third quarter of the 6th century BC.

Initially, the BMN Painter worked for the potter Lydos. Of the collaboration between the two, a band cup and a belly amphora are known. John Boardman sees the BMN Painter as both the earliest and the best vase painters to collaborate with the important potter Nikosthenes. The earliest works by them are a Siana cup and several Little-master cups, including a lip cup signed by Nikosthenes. The BMN Painter was the most significant representative of the Bellerophontes Class. He probably painted the majority of works by that grouping, including the name vase, depicting Bellerophontes fighting the chimaira.

The abbreviation BMN that provides his covnetional name stands for "British Museum" and "Nikosthenes" and refers to his name vase, inventory B 295 in that museum.

== Bibliography ==
- John Beazley: Attic Black-Figure Vase-Painters, Oxford 1956, p.
- John Boardman: Schwarzfigurige Vasen aus Athen. Ein Handbuch, Mainz 1977, ISBN 3-8053-0233-9, p. 72
