= Kyathos =

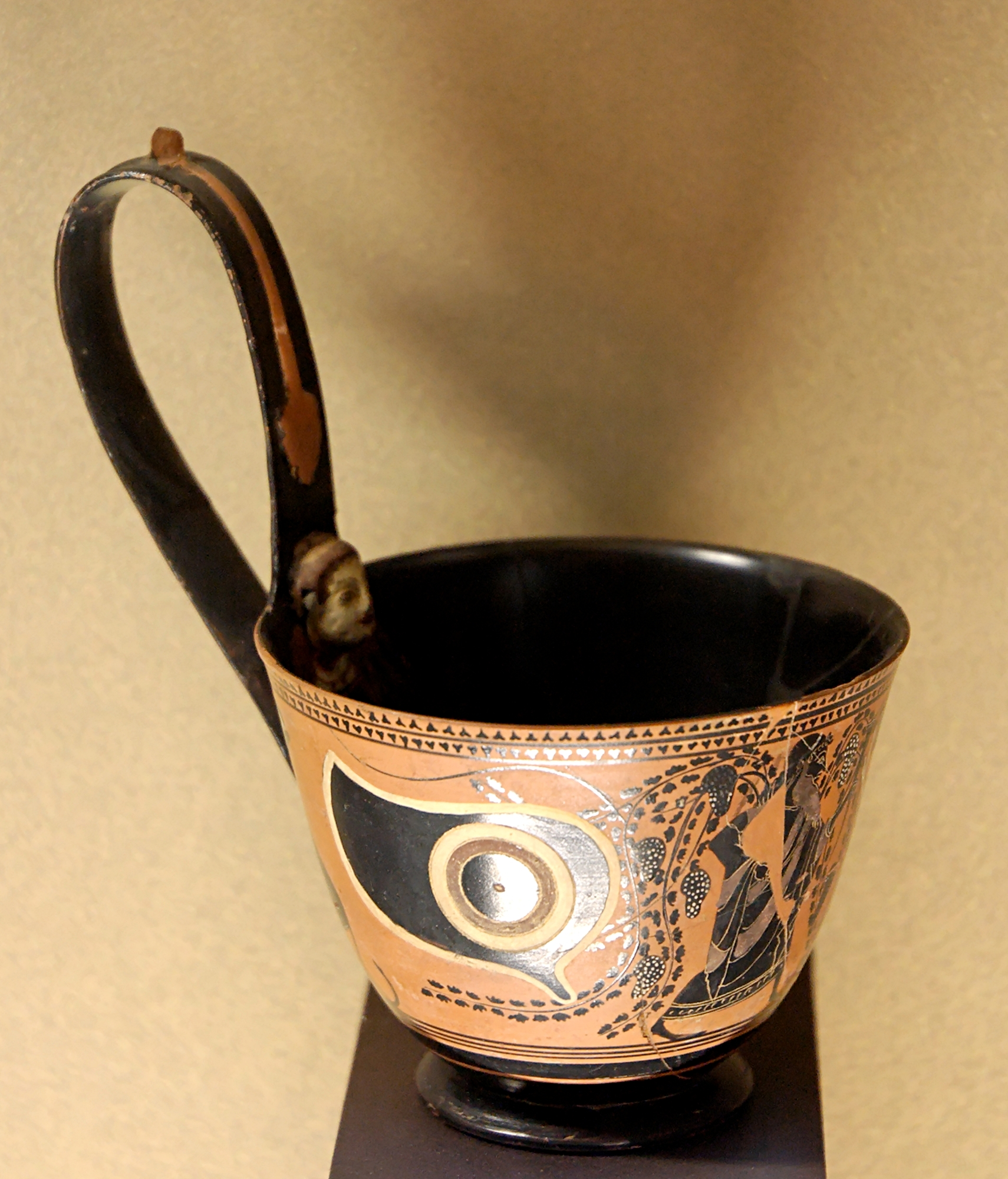
An example of a kyathos

Kyathos (Ancient Greek: κύαθος, kúathos) is the name given in modern terminology to a type of painted ancient Greek vase with a tall, round, slightly tapering bowl and a single, flat, long, looping handle. Its closest modern parallel would be a ladle. "The kyathos has a graceful shape resembling a teacup, though a bit larger, with a high looped, flat-strap or oval handle... The terracotta kyathos was used as a ladle for dipping diluted wine from a wine mixer".
