= Little Masters (Greek vase painting) =

Ancient Greek pottery group

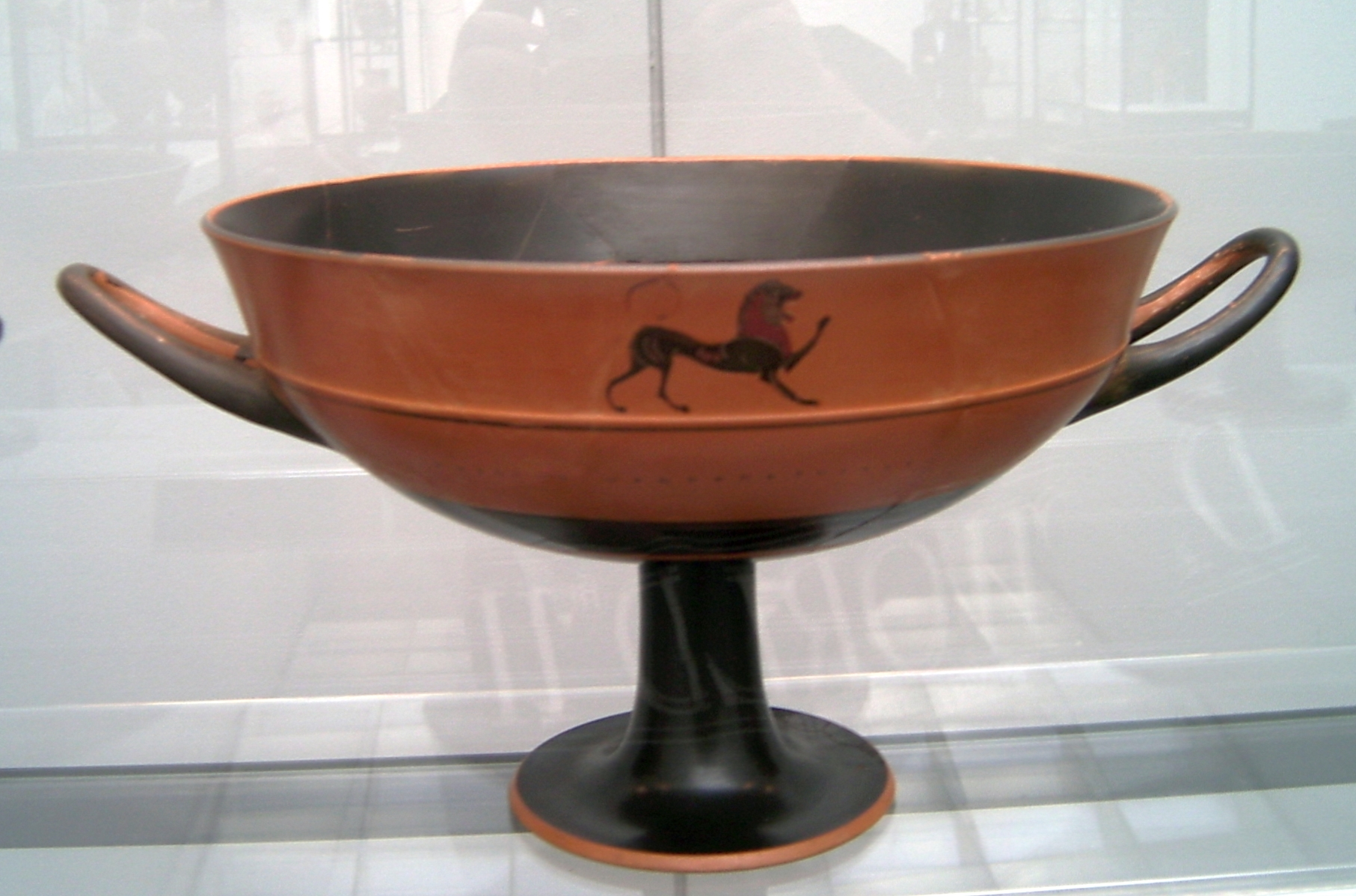
A Little masters cup

The Little masters were a group of potters and vase painters who produced vases of the Attic black-figure style featuring well-done figures in miniature. They were active in Athens approximately 560–530 BC. They mainly produced Little-master cups: lip cups, band cups, and droop cups, but were not entirely limited to such shapes. The group includes:

== Potters ==
- Anakles
- Antidoros
- Archeneides
- Archikles
- Charitaios
- Chiron
- Epitimos
- Ergoteles
- Eucheiros
- Gageos
- Glaukytes
- Hermogenes
- Hischylos
- Kaulos
- Kolchos
- Kritomenes
- Myspios
- Neandros
- Phrynos
- Priapos
- Sokles
- Sondros
- Taleides
- Teisias
- Telesias
- Thrax
- Thypheitides
- Tlempolemos
- Tleson
- Xenokles
- Botkin Class

== Vase painters ==
- Painter of Agora P 1241
- Ano Achaïia Painter
- Karithaios Painter
- Centauren Painter
- Neandros Painter
- Oakeshott Painter
- Painter of the Palermo Gorgoneion
- Phrynos Painter
- Sakonides
- Sokles Painter
- Taleides Painter
- Tleson Painter
- Painter of Vatican G 62
- Xenokles Painter

== Groups ==
- Charon Group
- Golvol Group
- Group of Louvre F 81
- Group of Rhodes 12264
- Group of Toronto 289
- Group of Vatican G 61
- Group of Villa Giulia 3559
