= Elbows Out =

Ancient Greek vase painter

Elbows Out is the name given to an Attic black-figure vase painter, active in Athens around 550/540 to 520 BC. His conventional name is derived from the strongly exaggerated gestures and odd anatomy of his dancing figures. Together with the Affecter, he is considered one of the Mannerists of the black-figure style. He painted e.g. lip cups (which classifies him as a Little master) and neck amphorae, the latter in a special shape with a heavy ovoid body. His amphorae are decorated with several friezes. His band cups resemble works by Tleson and Lydos, but are more conventional in terms of the animal motifs. He also painted a lydion, a vase shape very rarely produced by Attic potters. He is often seen as connected with the Affecter, but also with the Amasis Painter. The link with the latter should not be overestimated.

He rarely painted mythological scenes, but had a penchant for erotic motifs, as can be seen in his unusually shaped hydria at the Boston Museum of Fine Arts, the shoulder of which shows ten couples engaged in "riotous love-making".

A vase by Elbows Out from the Castle Ashby collection, assembled in the 1820s by the 2nd Marquess of Northampton, sold at auction for $233,640 in 1980.

== Bibliography ==
- Beazley, John: Attic Black-Figure Vase-Painters, Oxford 1956, p. 248-252.
- von Bothmer, Dietrich (1969). "Elbows Out". Revue Archéologique (1): 3–15. JSTOR 41755529.
- Fellmann, Berthold: Zwei neue Randschalen des Elbows Out Malers, In: Athenische Mitteilungen 99 (1984) p. 155-160.
- Boardman, John: Schwarzfigurige Vasen aus Athen. Ein Handbuch, Mainz 1977, ISBN 3-8053-0233-9, p. 73-74.
- Isler, Hans Peter: Der Töpfer Amasis und der Amasis-Maler. Bemerkungen zur Chronologie und zur Person, in: Jahrbuch des Deutschen Archäologischen Instituts 109 (1994) p. 93-114.
