= Band skyphos =

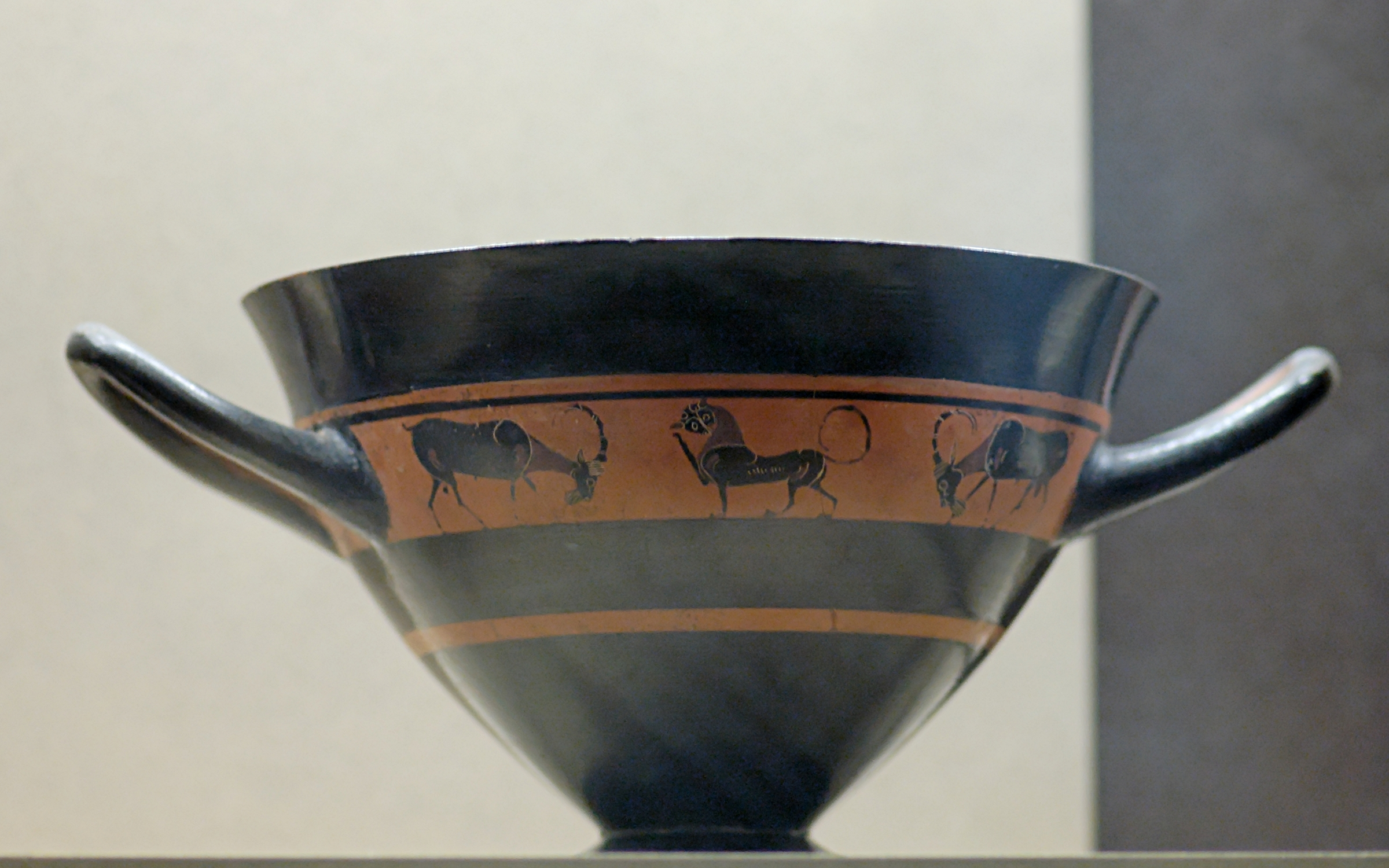
Hermogenic Skyphos by the Group of Rhodes 11941, circa 550BC, Louvre.

Band skyphoi (singular: band skyphos) are a specific form of ancient Attic vase. They are a hybrid between conventional skyphos and band cup. The shape of the skyphos is combined with decorative scheme of band cups. In terms of their shape, band skyphoi are somewhat squatter than the skyphoi of the Komast Group. As on band cups, their lips are concave. They tend to be of lower quality than cups. The fact that not a single band skyphos has so far been found to be signed indicates that the producers were aware of that difference. There are a number of further related shapes: for example, the Hermogenic skyphos (named after the potter Hermogenes), produced in a similar fashion to Komast Group skyphoi, but with very fine thin walls and slightly flayed lips. The Amasis Painter added a red stripe each on the exterior and interior surface to the conventional decoration.

== Bibliography ==
- John Boardman: Schwarzfigurige Vasen aus Athen. Ein Handbuch, Mainz 1977, ISBN 3-8053-0233-9, p. 69
