= Phrynos Painter =

Ancient Greek vase painter

Phrynos painter
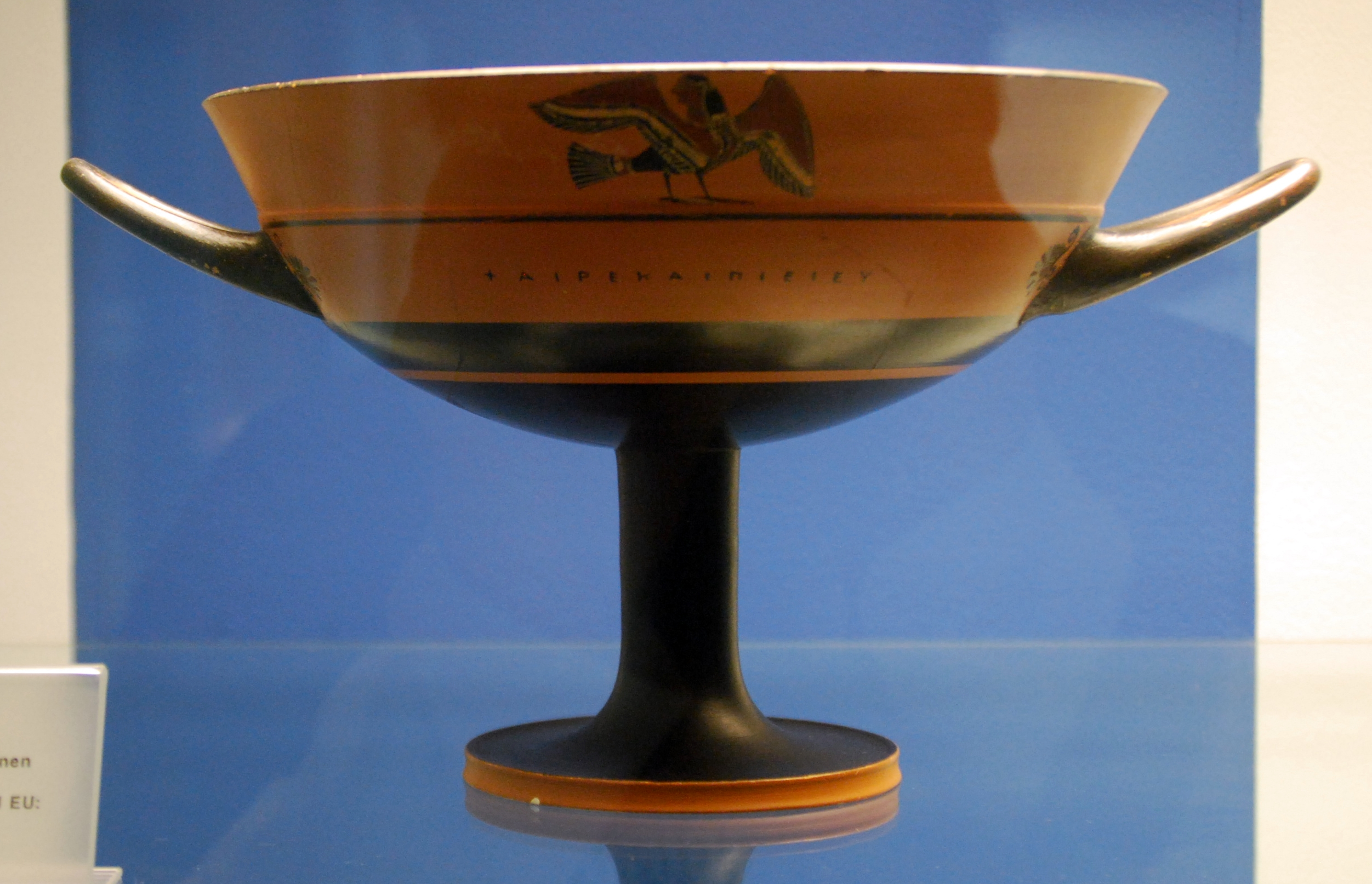
- Kylix painted by artist
- Born: Unknown. Named from Phrynos, who signed some of his works. Before 560 BCE
- Died: About 545 BCE
- Known for: Vase painting
- Movement: Little masters school, black-figure paintings

The Phrynos Painter was an Attic black-figure vase painter, active in Athens between c. 560 and 545 BC. He was allocated the conventional name "Phrynos Painter" after the potter Phrynos, as he had painted three cups signed by the latter:

- Boston, Museum of Fine Arts 03.855
- London, British Museum 1867.5-8.962 (B 424)
- Torgiano, Wine Museum A 15

The London cup is considered a masterpiece of the black-figure style. The Phrynos Painter belongs to the so-called Little masters; his paintings are very fine in detail and lively in style. Although a number of vases can be ascribed to him, his style is not yet fully understood.

== Further works (some disputed) ==
- Amsterdam, Allard Pierson Museum 8192: Band cup
- London, British Museum 1909.2-16.2: Fragment of a Little-master cup
- London, British Museum 1948.8-15.13: Fragment of a Little-master cup
- Los Angeles, Oldknow collection: Lip cup
- Rome, Museo Nazionale Etrusco di Villa Giulia 50586: Merrythought cup
- Vatican, Museo Gregoriano Etrusco 16596 (Albizzati 317): Lip cup
- Würzburg, Martin von Wagner Museum L 241: Belly amphora Type B

He also painted five small neck amphorae of the Botkin Class:

- Boston, Museum of Fine Arts 98.923
- Brussels, Royal Museums of Fine Arts of Belgium A 714
- St. Petersburg, Hermitage Museum 4464 (formerly Botkin Collection 1059)
- Milan 4636
- New York, Metropolitan Museum 64.11.13

== See also ==
- Little-Master cup

== Bibliography ==
- John Beazley: Attic Black-figure Vase-painters, Oxford 1956, p. 168-169.
- John Beazley: Paralipomena. Additions to Attic black-figure vase-painters and to Attic red-figure vase-painters, Oxford 1971, p. 70-71.
- Herman A. G. Brijder: A band-cup by the Phrynos Painter in Amsterdam, in: M. Gnade (Hrsg.): Stips votiva. Papers presented to Conrad Michael Stibbe, Amsterdam 1991, p. 21-30.
- Joan Tarlow Haldenstein: Little master cups. Studies in 6th century Attic black-figure vase painting, Dissertation University of Cincinnati 1975, p. 25-32.
- Peter Heesen: Phrynos (I), in: Künstlerlexikon der Antike Bd. 2, 2004, p. 256.
- Heide Mommsen: Phrynos-Maler, In: Der Neue Pauly Vol. 9 (2000), Col. 973
