= Phrynos =

Ancient Greek potter

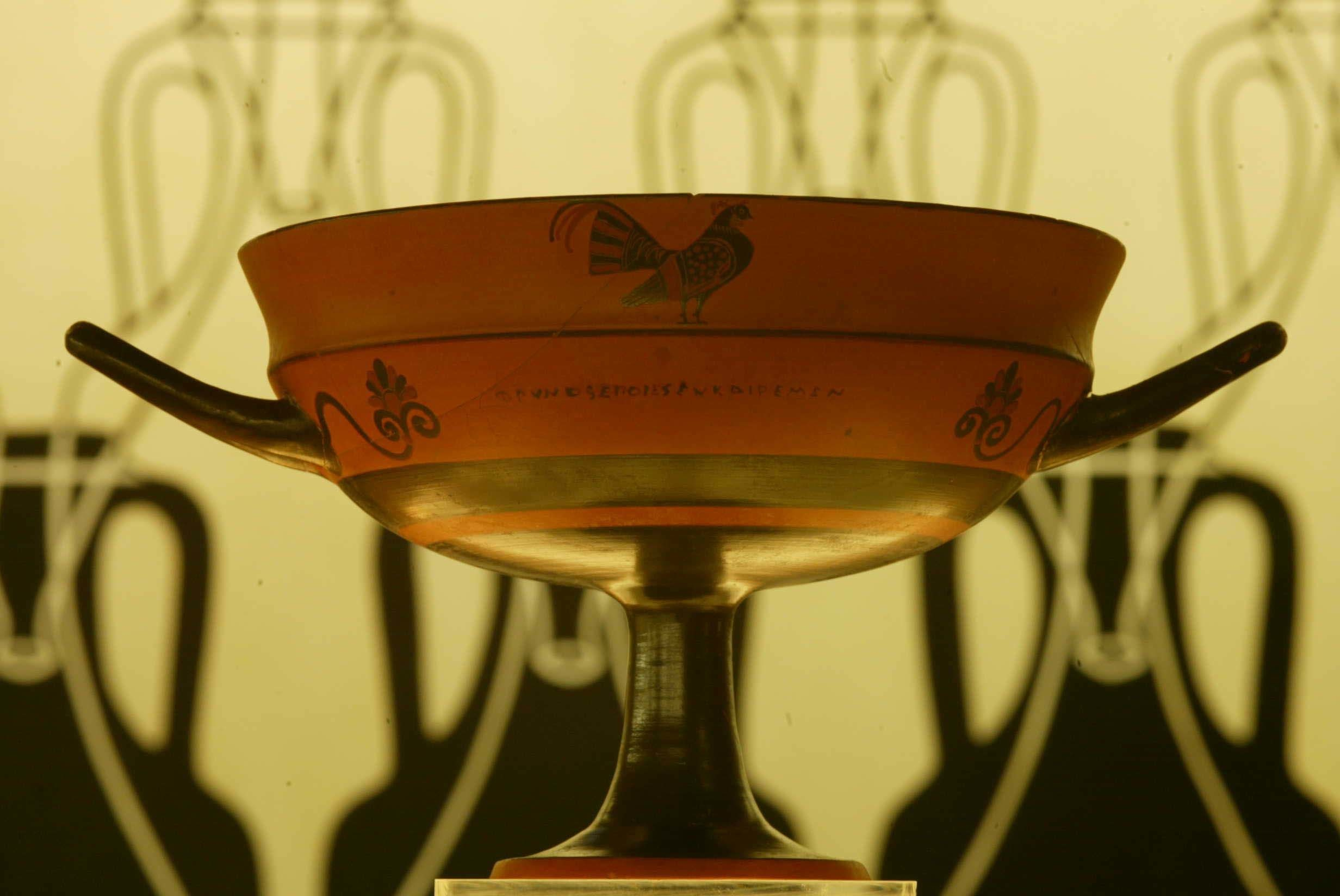
Phrynos lip cup in the Museo del vino Torgiano

Phrynos was a Greek potter, active in Athens, circa 560–545 BC. He is one of the Little masters. Three signed lip cups by him are known:

- Boston, Museum of Fine Arts Inv. 03.855
- London, British Museum Inv. 1867.5-8.962 (B 424)
- Torgiano, Wine Museum Inv. A 15

The three cups appear to have been painted by the same painter, the Phrynos Painter, to whom some further pieces can be ascribed. The potter Phrynos probably worked together with the potters Archikles and Glaukytes, as some of their vases bear close similarities.

== See also ==
- Little-Master cup
