= Athenian Band Cup by the Oakeshott Painter (MET 17.230.5) =

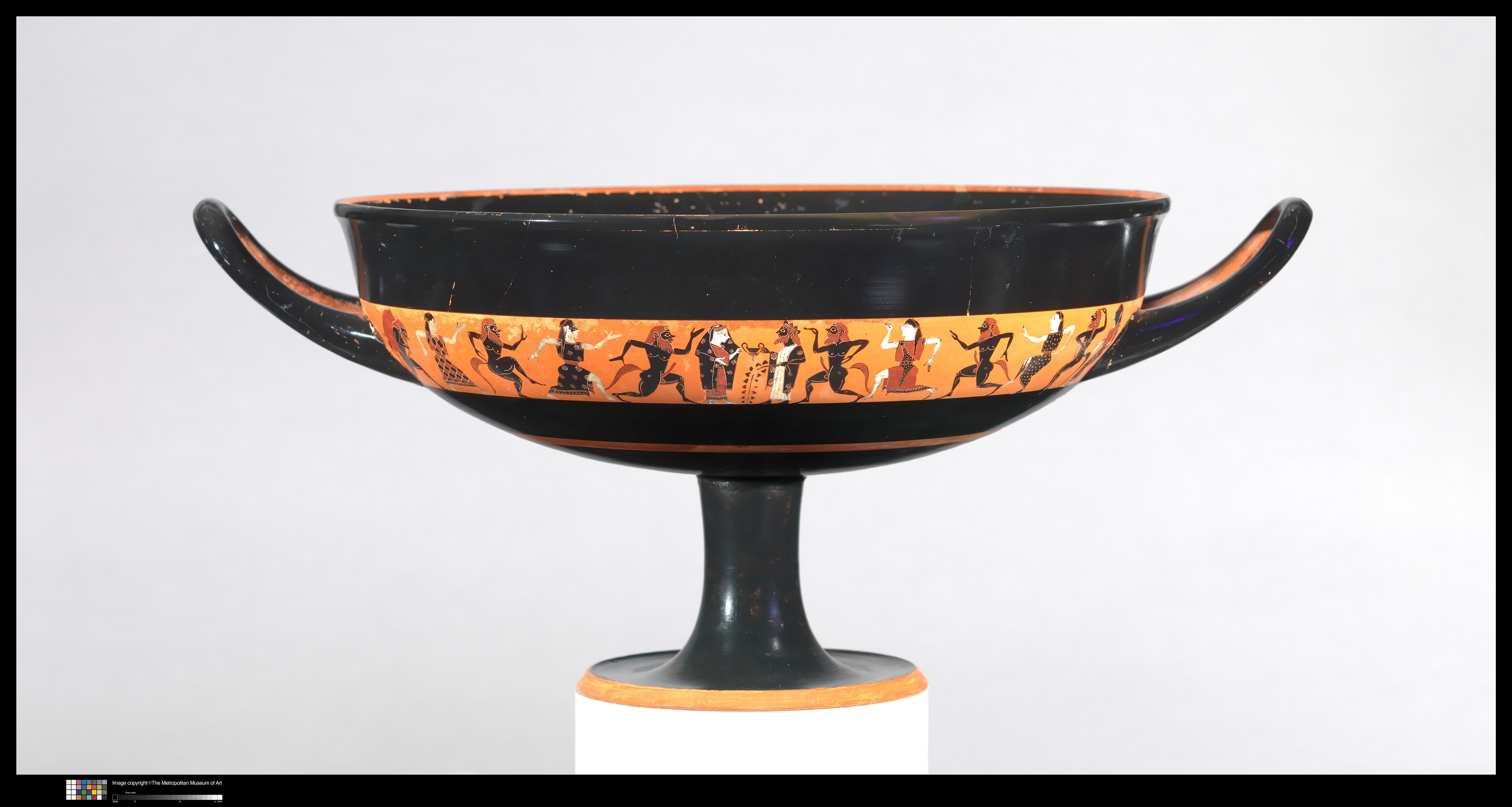
Athenian Band Cup by the Oakeshott Painter

The Athenian Band Cup (MET 17.230.5) is an Attic Greek kylix attributed to the Oakeshott Painter. It is further classified as a band cup, a type of Little-Master cup.

== Description ==
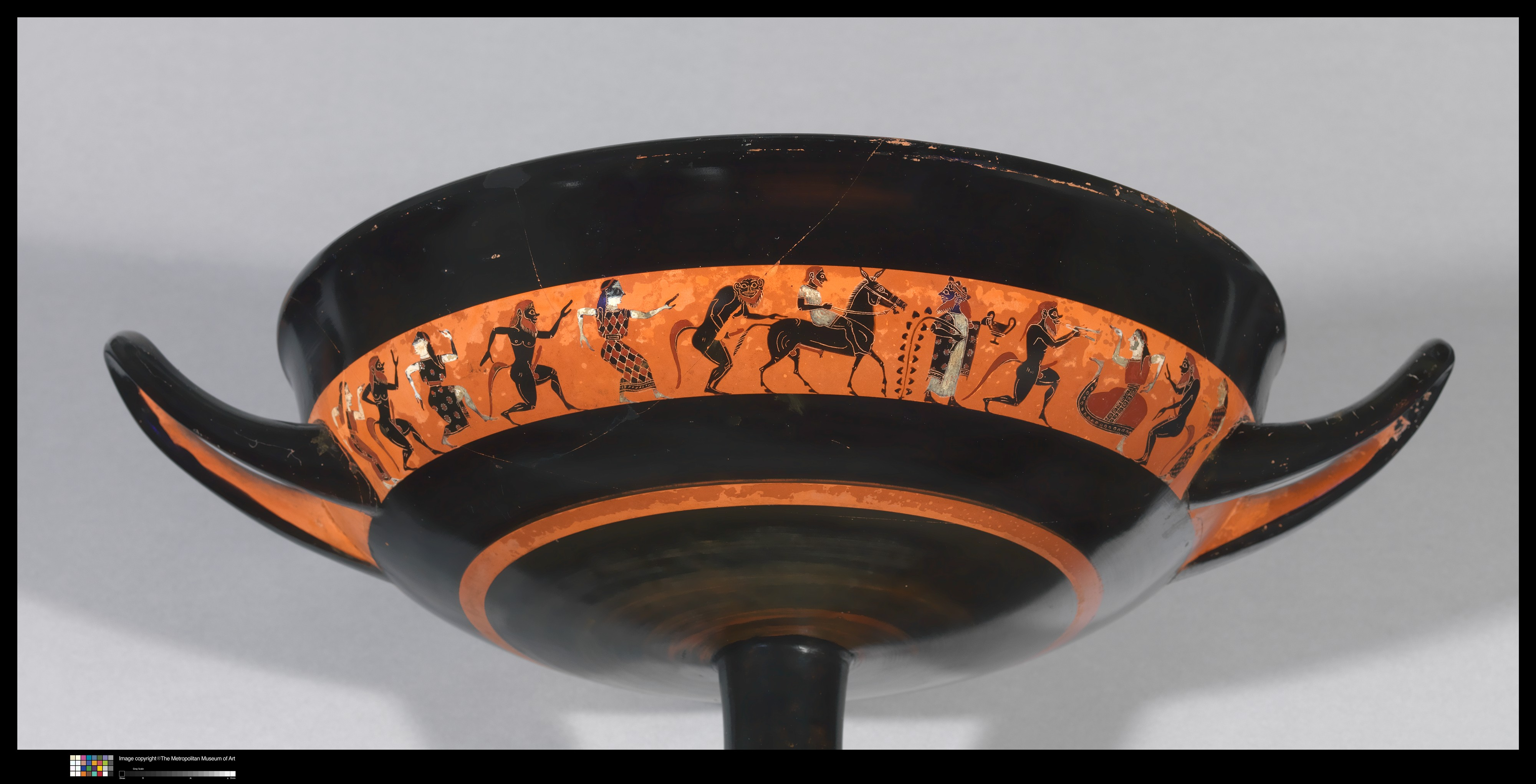
Return of Hephaistos

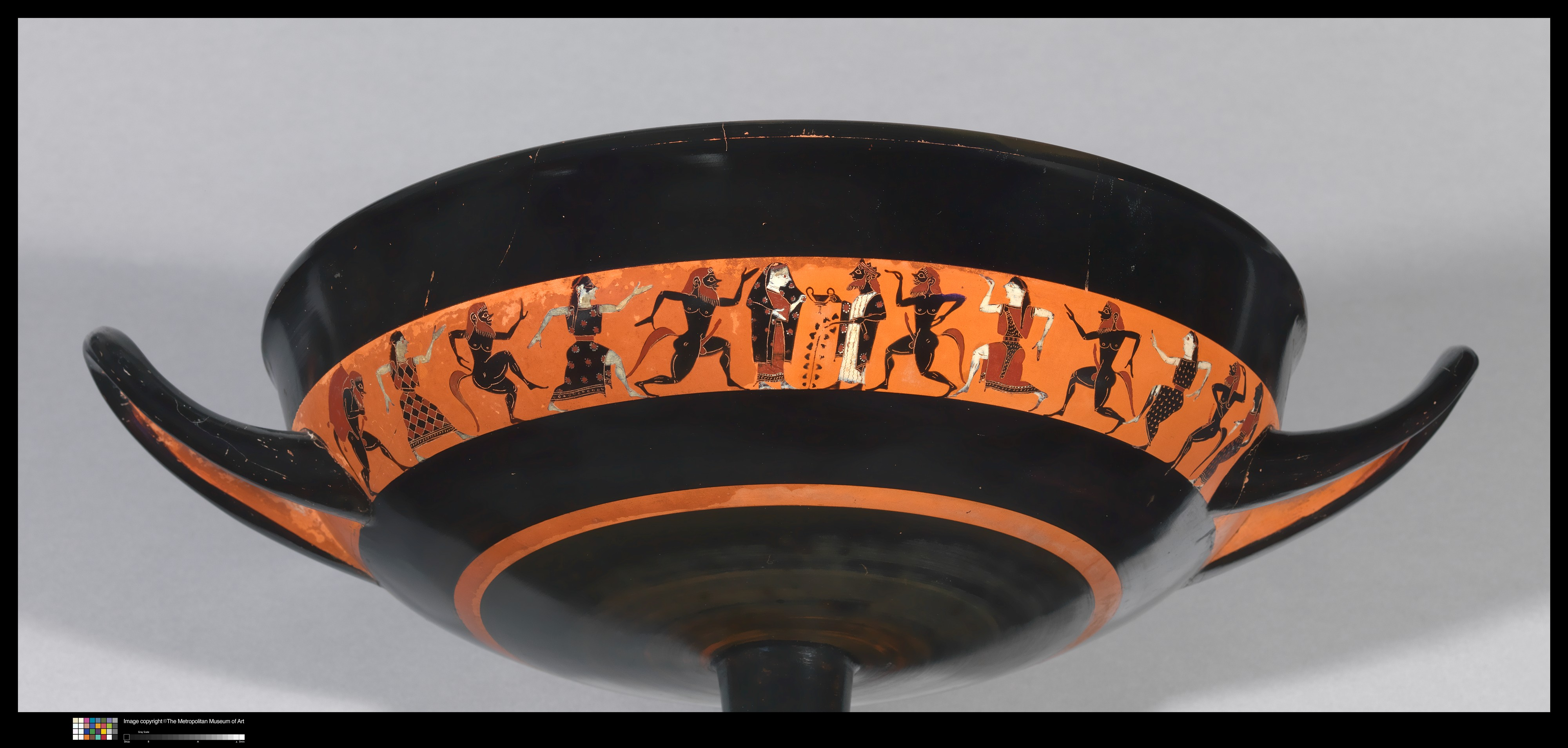
Dionysus and Ariadne

This terracotta band cup, or kylix, is 16.4 cm high and has a diameter of 28.4 cm. At present, it is exhibited in Gallery 155 (Greek Art: Sixth Century B.C.) at The Metropolitan Museum of Art.

The band serves as a miniature frieze, on one side showing the return of Hephaistos to Olympus, and on the other the wine god Dionysus with his wife, Ariadne.

Dionysus is indicated by his holding of a band cup, his long beard, and the thyrsus appearing staff or ivy vine. Ariadne has a shared gaze with Dionysus on the side featuring their encounter, and is the only female depicted wearing a mantle. In the other side of the cup, Hephaistos is depicted on his mule, or horse, being led by Dionysus, just as in the archaic story. The mule is shown to have an erect penis and all of the satyrs are depicted with obnoxiously long, erect penises, adding toward the theme of sexual excitement and celebration. Such themes were commonly seen on band cups used in symposiums. Both of these main scenes are surrounded by satyrs and maenads, who are depicted in a rhythmic dance.

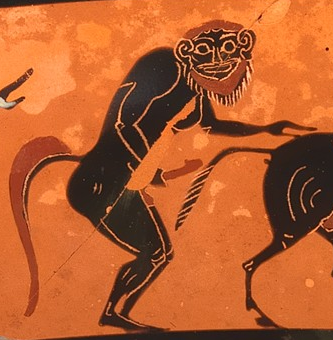
Detail of the Satyr facing the viewer.

A single figure stares at the viewer of the artwork; it is a satyr that can be found behind Hephaistos' mule. The outwardly facing satyr invites the viewer to become a participant in the scene of dancing maenads, which were similar to girls who could be seen dancing at a party. The on looking satyr is a common element in subsequent versions 'Return of Hepaistos' artworks, as can be seen in similarly depicted works, such as the column krater ascribed to Lydos.

== Function ==
The band cup is often depicted with imagery of Dionysus and served as a vessel used to hold wine at parties. Exploiting the circumstance in which band cups would exclusively be used, the imagery acts as encouragement, in addition to the wine, to engage in similar acts in the real world.

== Interpretation ==
This band cup shows an uninhibited procession, a common depiction of Dionysian myth.

Author Mary Moore discusses the importance of the viewer facing Satyr, being that it brings attention to the scene of Hephaistos and Dionysus, in which these two figures have their gazes fixated on each other which reflects the significance of their interaction. Author Anne Mackay elaborates on the decision artists who chose to depict outwardly facing figures as not simply a traditional motif, but as technique to direct viewer's attention and in which connected the world the artist's figure inhabits to the real world of the viewer. Furthermore, the outwardly facing satyr invites the viewer to become a participant in the scene of dancing maenads, which were similar to girls who could be seen dancing at a party. The gaze of the outwardly facing figure is a classic example of breaking the fourth wall, and the gaze often urges the viewer to share the figure's emotion.

== See also ==
- Band cup
- Kylix
- Little-master Cup
- Red-figure pottery
- Symposium
