= Sokles =

Ancient Greek potter

Sokles Ancient Greek: Σοκλῆς was an ancient Greek potter, active in the middle of the 6th century BC, in Athens. The following signed Little-master cups or fragments thereof are known, all of them painted by the Sokles Painter:

- Berlin, Antikensammlung F 1781
- Bolligen, Collection Rolf Blatter
- Daskyleion, Excavation E 108.107
- Madrid, Museo Arqueologico Nacional 10947 (L 56)
- Malibu (CA), J. Paul Getty Museum S.80.AE.60
- Oxford, Ashmolean Museum 1929.498
- Switzerland, private collection
- Taranto, Museo Archeologico Nazionale 20910

He belongs to the group of so-called Little masters. A red-figure plate in Paris, Louvre CA 2181, painted in style similar to that of the painter Paseas, is signed by a potter named Soklees. Whether that craftsman is identical with the black-figure potter Sokles remains unclear. The signature may also not be authentic.
