= Group of Rhodes 12264 =

Ancient Greek vase painters

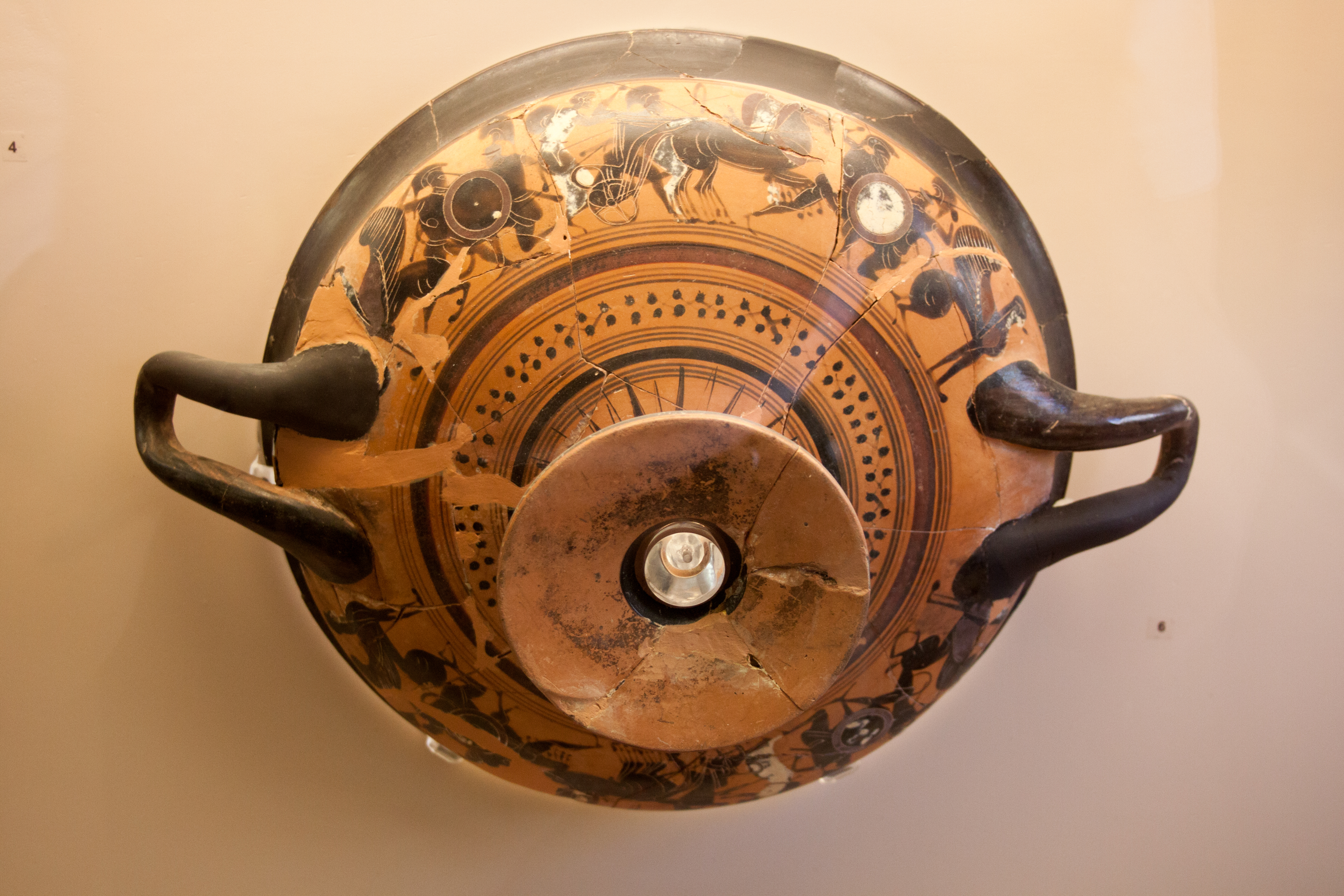
Droop cup, Group of Rhodes (540-520 BC).

The Group of Rhodes 12264 is a Group of Attic black-figure vase painters, active in Athens around the middle of the 6th century BC. They belong to the so-called Little masters. The Group is named after the Droop cup inv. 12264 in the Archaeological Museum of Rhodes. They painted exclusively cups, mostly Droop cups with friezes in the handle zone.

== Bibliography ==
- John Beazley: Attic Black-Figure Vase-Painters, Oxford 1956, p. 192-194
- John Boardman: Schwarzfigurige Vasen aus Athen. Ein Handbuch, Mainz 1977, ISBN 3-8053-0233-9, p. 68
