= Ergoteles (potter) =

Ancient Greek potter

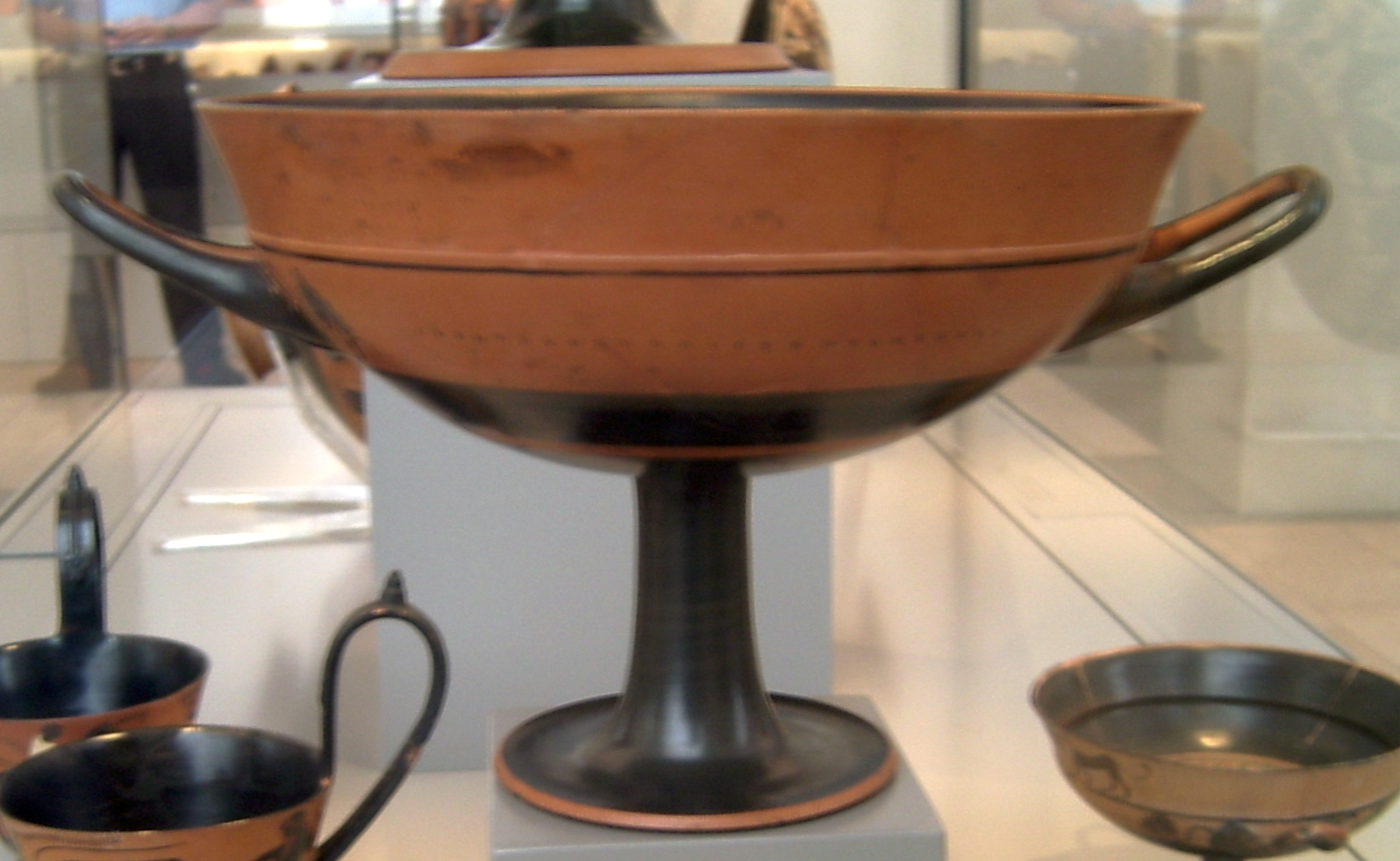
Cup with Ergoteles signature, in the Antikensammlung Berlin

Ergoteles (Έργοτέλης) was a Greek potter, active in Athens around the middle of the 6th century BC. He was the son of the famous potter Nearchos and the brother of Tleson. Three signed Little-master cups by him are known:

- Berlin, Antikensammlung F 1758
- Florence, arts trade
- Oxford, Ashmolean Museum G 1004

== Bibliography ==
- John Beazley: Attic Black-Figure Vase-Painters, Oxford 1956, p. 162.
- Künstlerlexikon der Antike I, München, Leipzig 2001, p. 213-214 s.v. Ergoteles (Rolf Blatter)
