= Kassel cup =

Ancient Greek pottery

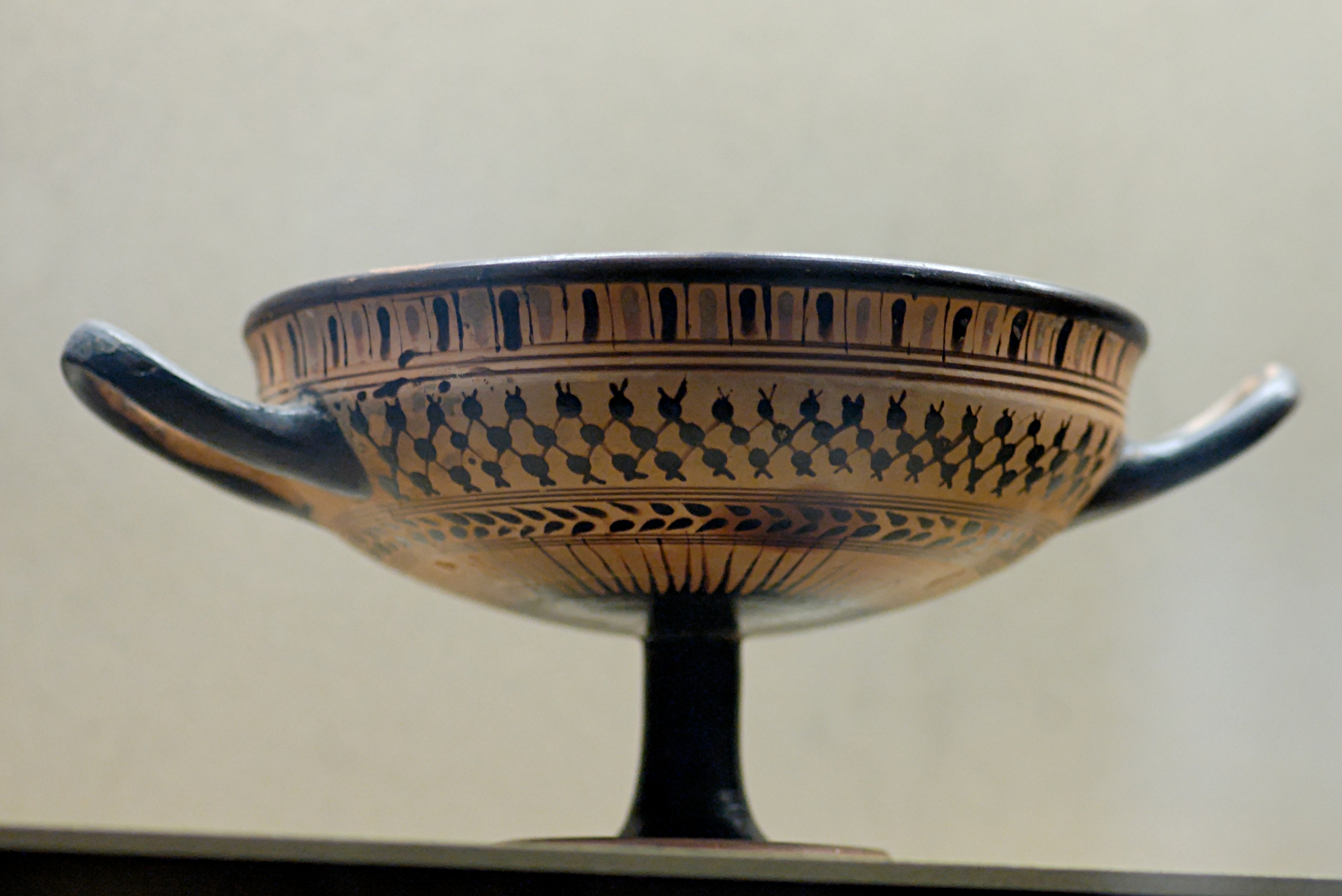
Kassel cup, c. 540 BC, Louvre, Inv. E 673.

Kassel cups are a specific type of Attic Little-master cups, produced in Athens around 540 to 520 BC. Kassel cups are quite similar to Band cups, but shallower and usually rather small. The lip and body of the vase are usually decorated with simple band patterns. Normally, there are flame motifs on the lip and rays on the body. Some painters added silhouette-like figures in the handle zone. The decorations suggest a link with Siana cups.

The name is derived from a piece found on Samos in 1898, and on display in Kassel until its destruction in 1945.

== Bibliography ==
- John Boardman: Schwarzfigurige Vasen aus Athen. Ein Handbuch, Mainz 1977, ISBN 3-8053-0233-9, p. 69
- Berthold Fellmann, in: Kunst der Schale – Kultur des Trinkens, München 1990, p. 23. 38
