= Tleson =

Ancient Greek potter and possible vase-painter of the black-figure style

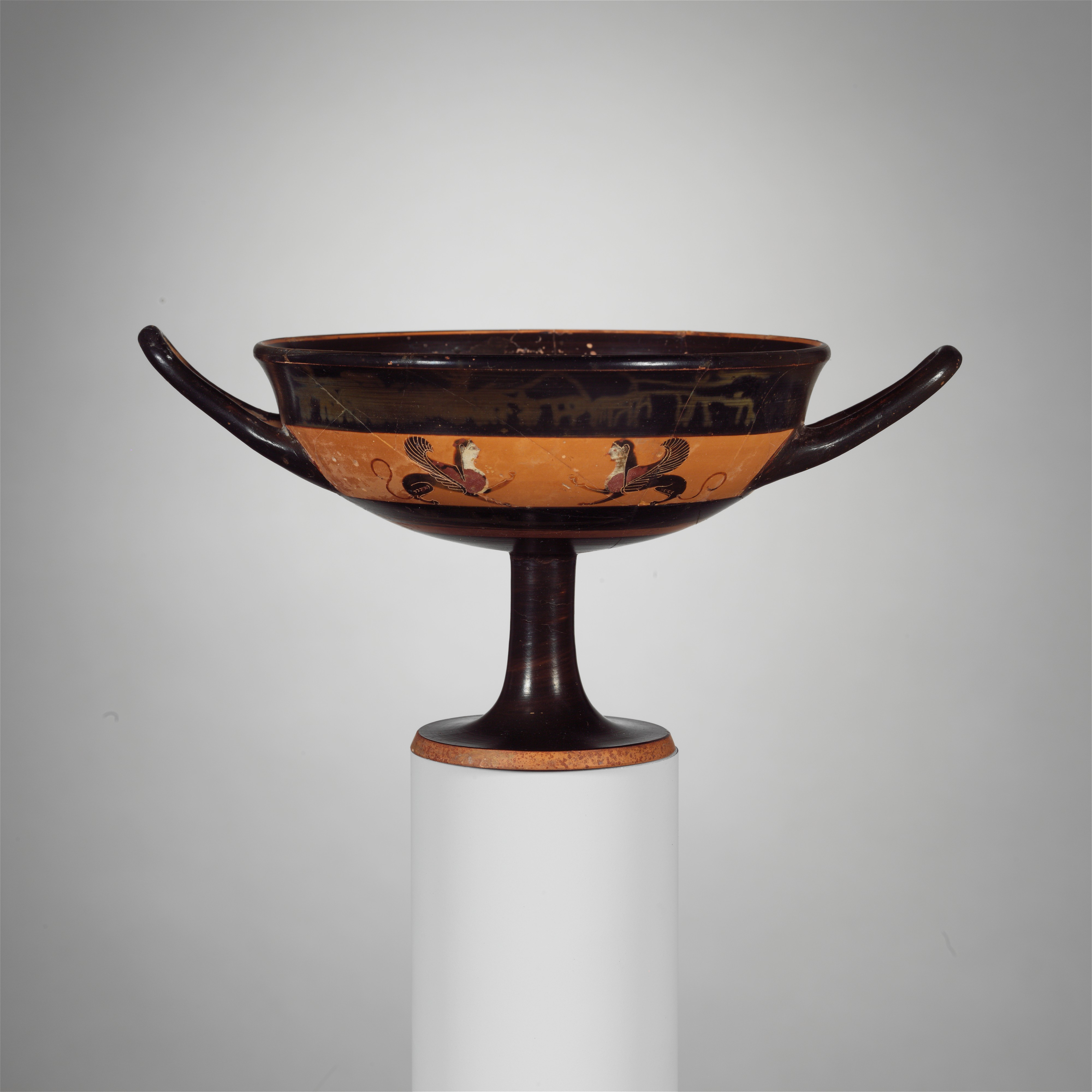

Tleson (active around 555-535 BC) was an Attic potter and perhaps also a vase painter in the black-figure style. He was the son of the famous potter Nearchos and brother of Ergoteles. His workshop apparently produced mostly Little-master cups. Most of his vases were painted by the Tleson Painter, whose real name is unknown, and whose conventional name is derived from Tleson. Based on the fact that vases known by that hand so far are only ever signed by Tleson, John Beazley suggested that Tleson and the Tleson painter may be identical. There is no proof for this hypothesis. Some of Tleson's pots were painted by other artists, such as Oltos and the Centaur Painter.

== Selected works ==
Where no painter is named, the vases were painted by the Tleson painter
- Athens, Agora Museum

Fragment of a Little-master cup P 13349

- Athens, National Museum

Pyxis 502 • Fragment of a Little-master cup Acr. 613 • Fragment of a Little-master cup Acr. 1567 • Fragment of a Little-master cup Acr. 1570 • Fragment of a Band cup AP 501

- Basel, Antikenmuseum und Sammlung Ludwig

Cup BS 405

- Berlin, Antikensammlung

Little-master cup F 1760

- Bonn, Akademisches Kunstmuseum

Little-master cup 53

- Boston, Museum of Fine Arts

Fragment of a Little-master cup 03.851 • Little-master cup 92.2655 • Cup 98.920 • Fragment of a Little-master cup F 357.2

- Braunschweig, Herzog Anton Ulrich-Museum

Fragment of a Little-master cup 495

- Brussels, Royal Museums of Fine Arts of Belgium

Little-master cup R 385 B • Little-master cup R 385 C

- Bryn Mawr, Bryn Mawr College

Fragment of a Little-master cup P 175

- Compiègne, Musée Vivenel

Little-master cup 1091

- Dresden, Skulpturensammlung

Little-master cup ZV 2714

- Erlangen, Friedrich-Alexander-Universität

Fragment of a Little-master cup 837

- Göttingen, Georg-August-Universität

Fragment of a Little-master cup 66

- Heidelberg, Heidelberg University

Fragment of a Litt Fragment of a Little-master cup Fragment einer Kleinmeisterschale S 30 • Fragment of a Little-master cup S 31

- Izmir, İzmir Archaeological Museum

Fragment of a Little-master cup 49 A

- Karlsruhe, Baden State Museum

Little-master cup HC 1419 (Centaur Painter)

- Leipzig, Museum of Antiquities of Leipzig University

Little-master cup T 52 • Fragment of a cup T 433

- London, British Museum

Little-master cup 1867.5-8.946 • Little-master cup B 410 • Little-master cup B 411 • Cup B 420 • Cup B 421

- Malibu, J. Paul Getty Museum

Little-master cup 76.AE.90 • Little-master cup 80.AE.99.3

- Manchester, Manchester Art Gallery

Band cup 111H51

- Moscow, State Historical Museum

Little-master cup

- Munich, Antikensammlung

Little-master cup 2126 • Little-master cup 2127 • Little-master cup 2149 • Fragment of a Little-master cup 9413 (Painter unknown) • Fragment of a Little-master cup 9417 (Painter unknown) • Band cup SL 462

- Naples, Museo Archeologico Nazionale

Fragment of a cup 81338 (Oltos) • Little-master cup H 2528 • Little-master cup Stg 271

- New York, Metropolitan Museum of Art

Little-master cup 27.122.30 • Band cup GR 542

- Nicosia, Cyprus Museum

Little-master cup C 438

- Oxford, Ashmolean Museum

Fragment of a Little-master cup 1953.11 • Fragment of a Little-master cup 1953.12 • Little-master cup G 137.35

- Paris, BnF Museum

Little-master cup 317

- Paris, Musée National du Louvre

Little-master cup F 86

- Rome, Museo Nazionale di Villa Giulia

Little-master cup M 608

- St. Petersburg, Hermitage Museum

Little-master cup

- Syracuse, Museo archeologico regionale Paolo Orsi

Little-master cup 43985

- Taranto, National Archaeological Museum of Taranto

Little-master cup 4440

- Toledo, Toledo Museum of Art

Cup 1958.70

- Vatican, Museo Gregoriano Etrusco

Little-master cup 322 • Fragment of a band cup AST 345

- Warsaw, Muzeum Narodowe

Band cup 147262

- Washington, National Museum of Natural History

Little-master cup 42207 A (Painter unknown)

- Würzburg, Martin von Wagner Museum

Little-master cup L 409

== Bibliography ==
- John D. Beazley: Attic Black-Figure Vase-Painters, Oxford 1956
- Berthold Fellmann: Zur Chronologie des Tleson Malers. In: Vasenforschung und „Corpus Vasorum Antiquorum“. Standortbestimmung und Perspektiven, München 2002, p. 111-121.
