= Hermogenes (potter) =

Ancient Greek potter from Attica

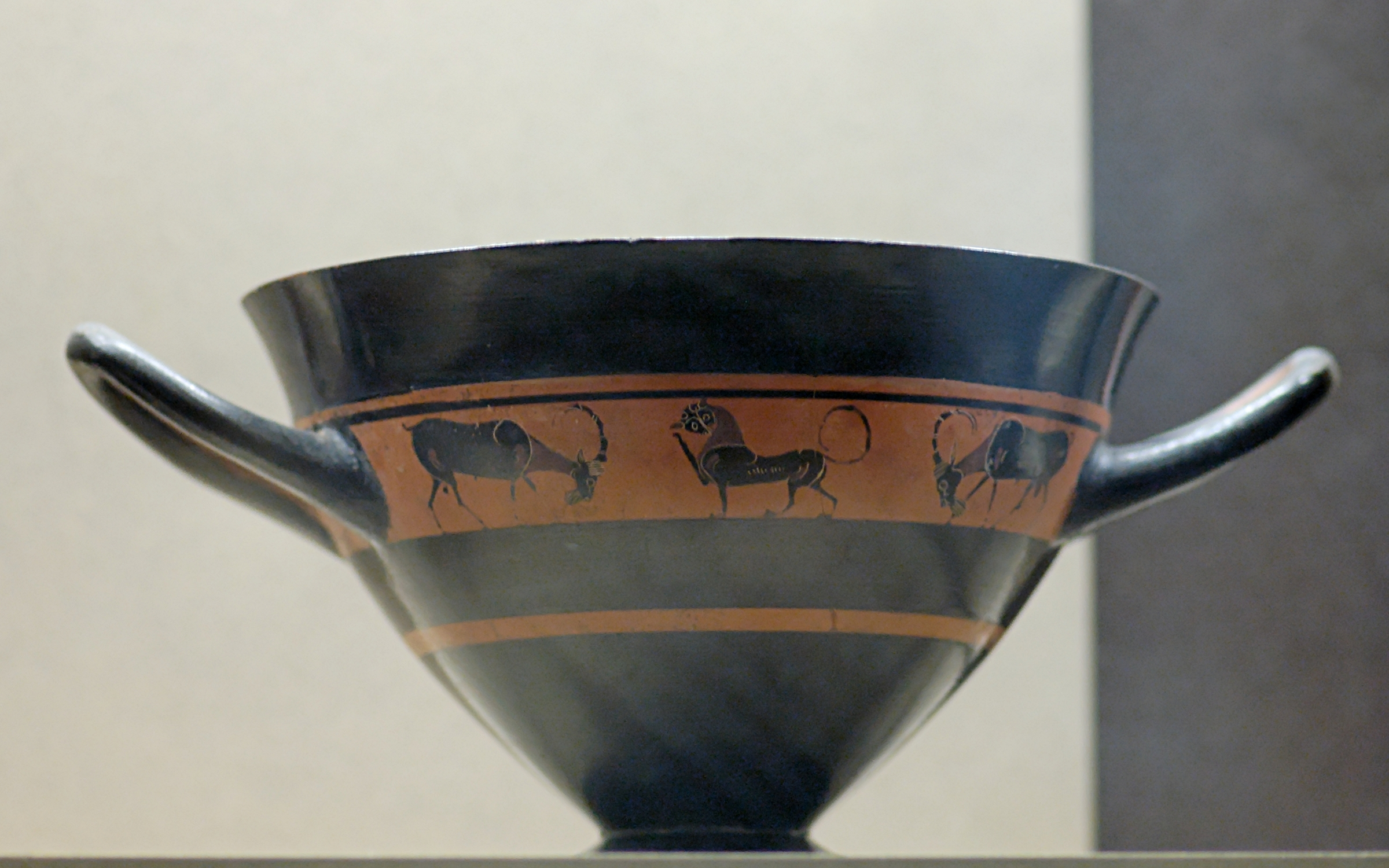
Hermogenes skyphos Louvre S1836

Hermogenes was an Attic potter. He was active in Athens in the mid-6th century BC and belongs to the group known as the Little masters. Hermogenes mainly produced cups (kylikes). Well-known are his band cups with depictions of women's heads on the band. The band skyphos, a specific type of skyphos with decoration resembling that of band cups is named after him. Hermogenes was an innovative potter. For example, similar to the potter Amasis, he made lip cups with feet derived from those of Siana cups.

== Bibliography ==
- John Beazley: Attic Black-Figure Vase-Painters, Oxford 1956, p.
- John Boardman: Schwarzfigurige Vasen aus Athen. Ein Handbuch, Mainz 1977, ISBN 3-8053-0233-9, p. 66-70
