= Lip cup =

Type of ancient Greek pottery

Lip cups are a type of ancient Greek Attic Little-master cups. Lip cups were produced from the middle of the sixth century BC in Athens. They resemble Gordion cups, but their lips or rims were more clearly distinguished from the rest of the body. They had high feet on broad bases. Early specimens in particular feature hollow conical feet with walls of even thickness.

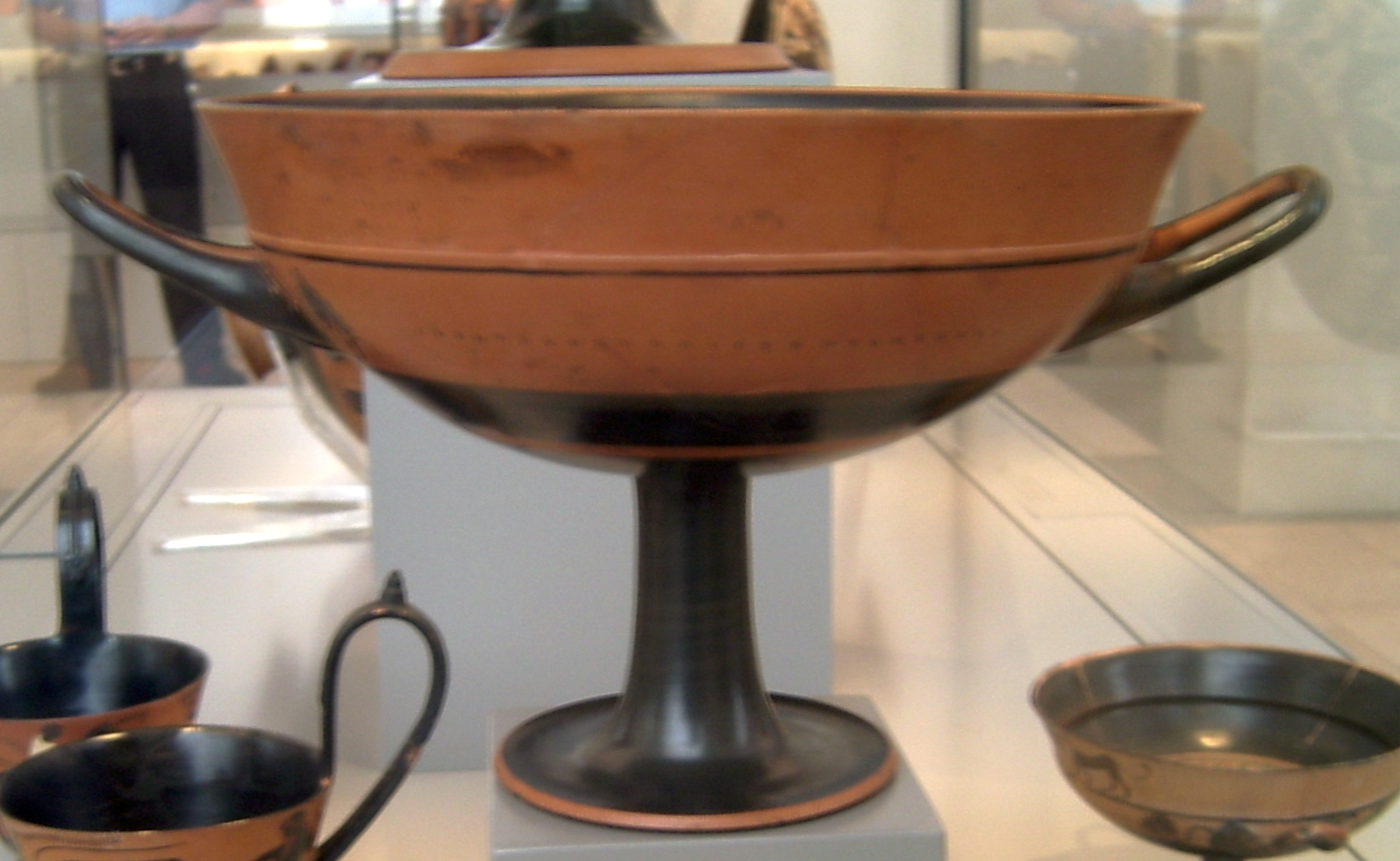
Attic lip cup with the signature of the potter Xenokles, c. 540/530 BC. Antikensammlung Berlin.

This cup type was painted on the lip/rim. Usually, one to three figures are placed at the centre of the front and back, painted directly onto the base clay. Complete mythical scenes were rare. Often, the lip remained completely undecorated. Further decorations were painted in the handle zone. They nearly always included inscriptions between the handle palmettes, as well as a painted strip near the upper edge. Rarely, the palmettes are replaced with animal or human figures. The inscriptions can be of mottos or toasts, or simply be meaningless arrays of letters, suggesting a mostly ornamental function. The cup interior frequently contained circular figural paintings, often surrounded by flame patterns with white dots at the points. In some cases, the lip is decorated with vegetal ornaments rather than figures.

It remains unknown why band cups and lip cups existed side by side for a considerable period. Perhaps, each variant had its own distinctive advantages. For example, it may have been more pleasant to drink from the undecorated black-slipped lip of a band cup, while the strong ridge underneath the rim of lip cups would have prevented spilling more effectively. Lip cups were somewhat more difficult to produce. Well-known artists of this type were Tleson, Sakonides, Hermogenes, Epitimos, Xenokles, the Xenokles Painter, the Taleides Painter, the Phrynos Painter and Phrynos.

== Bibliography ==
- John Boardman: Schwarzfigurige Vasen aus Athen. Ein Handbuch, Mainz 1977. ISBN 3-8053-0233-9. p. 65f.
