= Xenokles Painter =

The Xenokles Painter was an Attic vase painter in the black-figure style, active around the middle of the 6th century BC. His real name is unknown. His conventional name is based on the fact that he often painted vases made by the potter Xenokles, with whom he may be identical. In artistic terms, he did not reach the talent of comparable painters, such as the Tleson Painter. Characteristic of his work is his habit of cramming lip cups with figures, comparable to the normal decoration of Siana cups.

== Bibliography ==
- John Beazley: Attic Black-Figure Vase-Painters, Oxford 1956, p. 184-186.
- John Boardman: Schwarzfigurige Vasen aus Athen. Ein Handbuch, Mainz 1977, ISBN 3-8053-0233-9, p. 67
- Rolf Blatter: Xenokles (I), in: Künstlerlexikon der Antike Bd. 2 (2004) p. 520
