= Nearchos (painter) =

Ancient Greek potter and vase painter

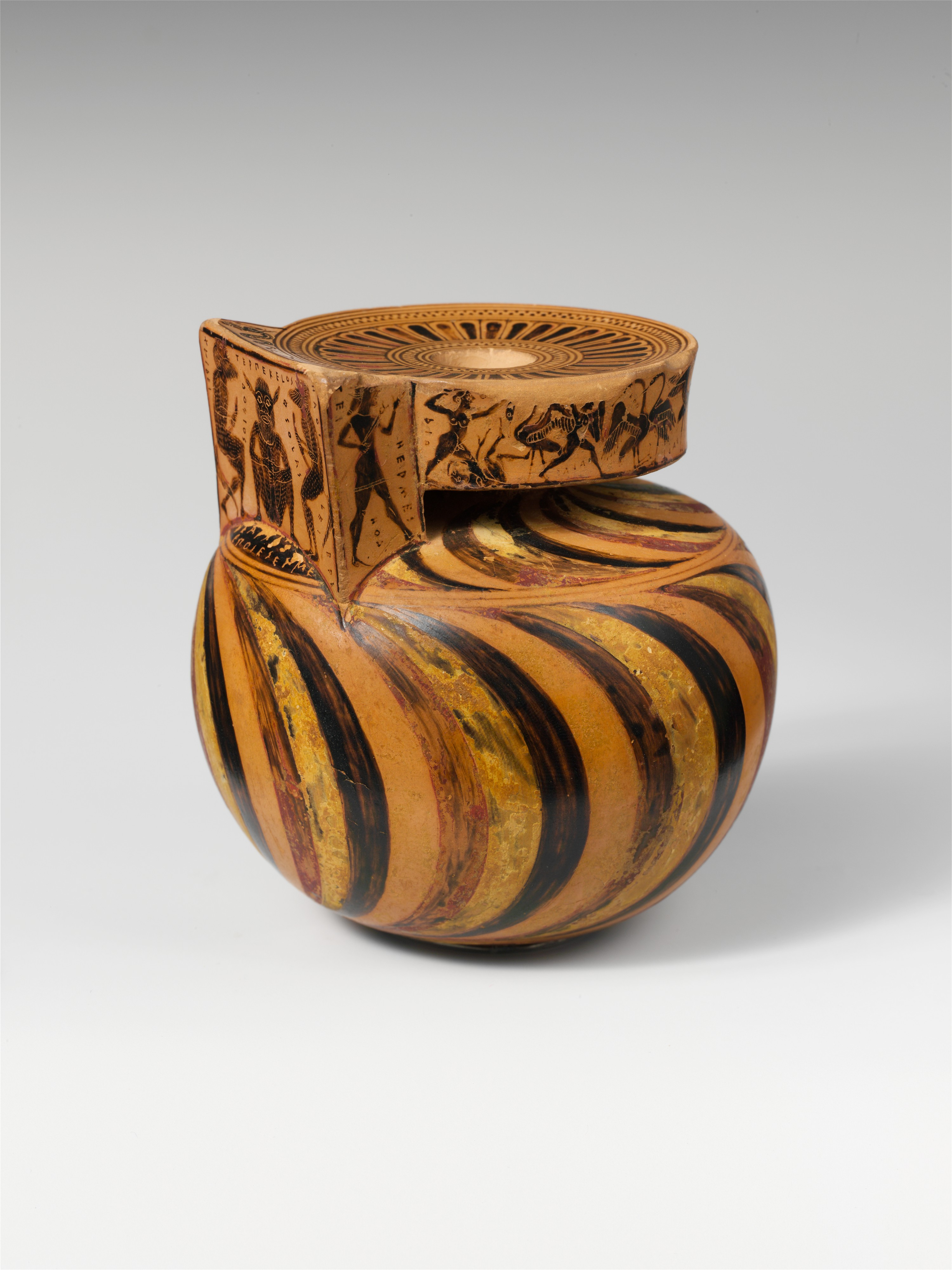
Terracotta black-figure aryballos (circa 570 BC), signed by Nearchos. Metropolitan Museum of Art

Nearchos (Greek: Νέαρχος) was an Attic potter and vase painter of the black figure style, active in Athens c. 570 to 555 BC.

In some stylistic terms, particularly his fine drawings, Nearchos seems closely connected to the Painter of Acropolis 606. Unlike his contemporaries, he achieved figures with a striking sense of dignity, comparable to those painted much later by Exekias. Especially striking is a kantharos, probably both shaped and painted by Nearchos, which depicts Achilles harnessing his horses. Kantharoi were one of his favourite shapes, and he signed them as both potter and painter. He also introduced some innovations, such as the attempt to render a horse's body in white paint. Not all his experiments can be considered successful.

A further vessel that exemplifies his artistic mastery is an aryballos in the Corinthian style, decorated with a frieze of pygmies and cranes along the rim. Strikingly, the vessel is less than 8 cm tall and the frieze only covers a fraction of its surface. Nerachos also produced Little-master cups.

== Bibliography ==
- John Beazley: Attic Black-figure Vase-Painting, Oxford 1956, p. 82-83.
- John D. Beazley: Paralipomena. Additions to Attic black-figure vase-painters and to Attic red-figure vase-painters, Oxford 1971, p. 30-31.
- Bettina Kreuzer: Nearchos (I), in: Künstlerlexikon der Antike II, 2004, p. 113-114.
