= Droop cup =

Type of ancient Greek pottery

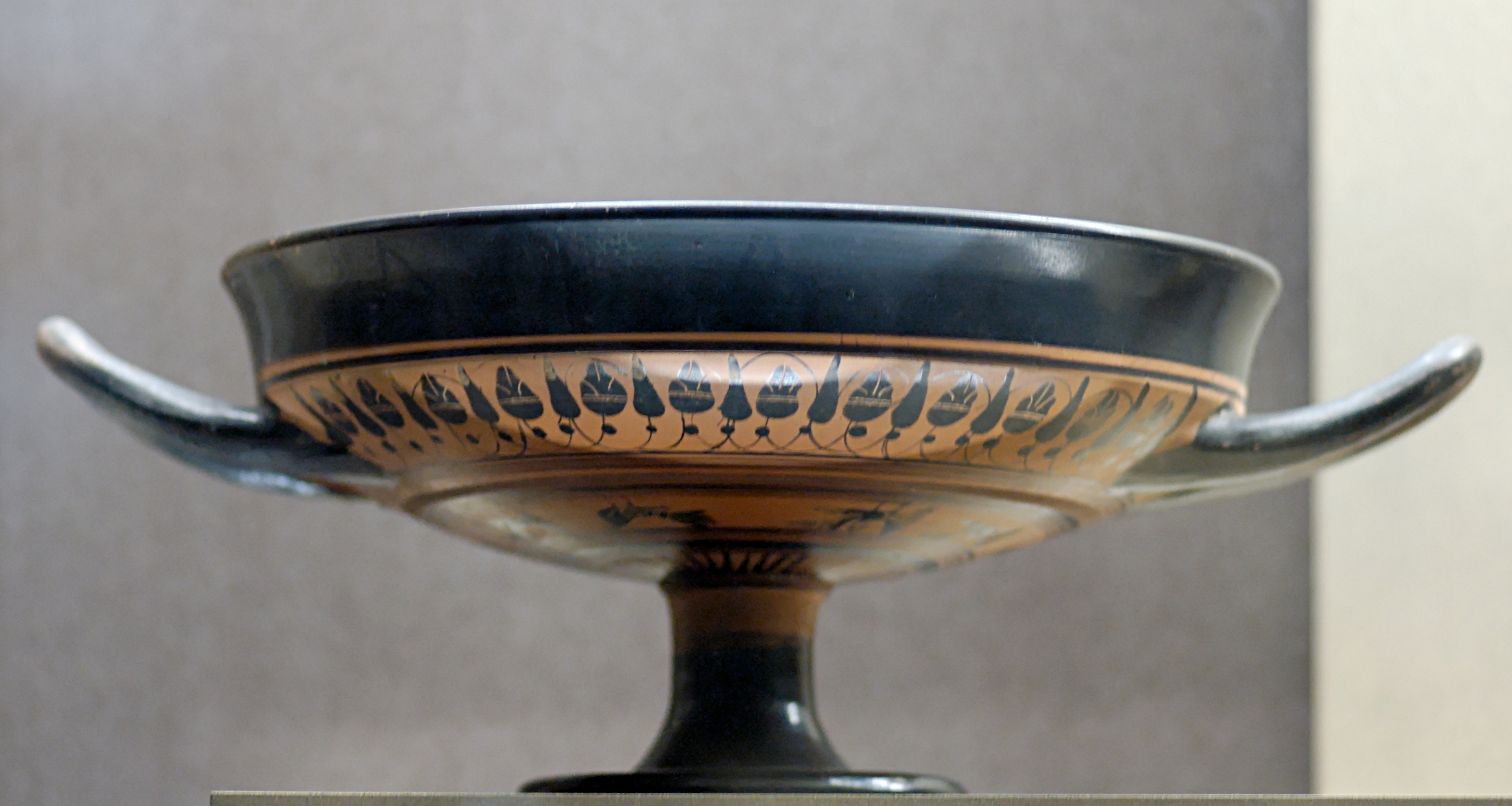
Droop cup, Paris, Louvre CA 2512

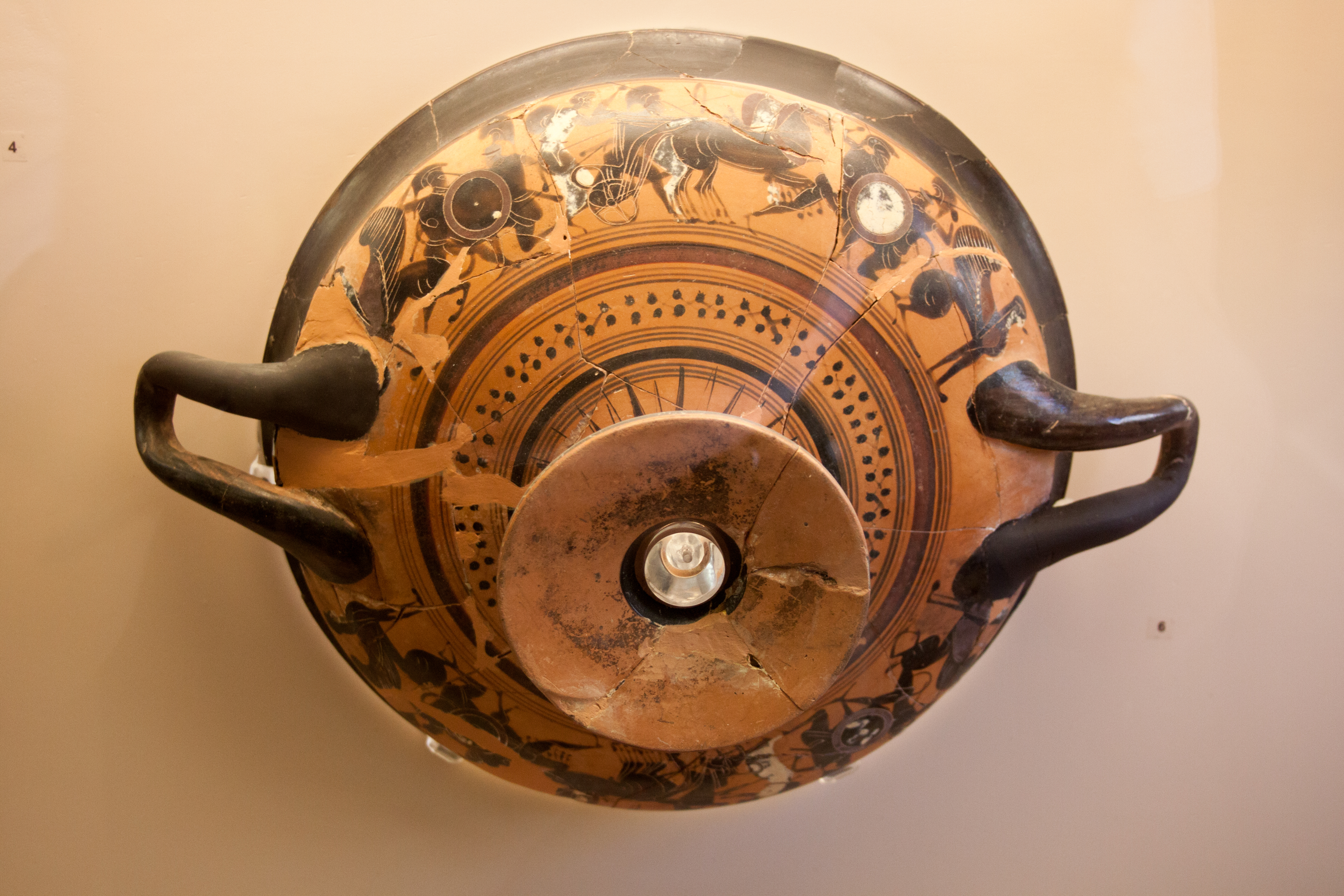
Underside of another cup, "Group of Rhodes", 540–520 BC

Droop cups (pronounced: Drope) are a type of Little-master cup in the pottery of ancient Greece, produced about 550 to 510 BC, probably mostly in Laconia. A few examples date to the fifth century BC. They are named after John Percival Droop, an English archaeologist, who first recognised the type.

Droop cups have black concave lips, more clearly distinguished from the lower vase body than on other types of Little-master cup. The feet are high; at the upper end they bear a ridge in natural base clay colour and a similar band just below, sometimes slashed. The edge of the base is painted black. The interior of the hollow foot has a broad black band of paint. On the base interior, the black slip is usually interrupted by a stripe deep below the rim; at times a circle at the bottom is also left free of black.

The cups of this type date to about 550 BC. The earliest specimens are completely black, a type that remains in production throughout later developments. Some early examples bear rows of bud-like decorations in the handle area. From c. 540 BC, decoration changes in so far that now the entire vase exterior below the lip and above the foot is decorated with bands, palmettes, leaves, dots, rays, or animal silhouettes. Figural decoration is rare.

Details of the post-540 decorative style are so similar to cups from Laconia that a connection must be assumed. It is likely that both regions used the same East Greek examples as inspiration. Later, decorative schemes were directly adopted from Sparta. The type goes mostly out of use around 510 BC, although black-slipped cups continue to be made for longer.

== Bibliography ==
- John Percival Droop: The dates of the vases called 'Cyrenaic', in: Journal of Hellenic Studies 30, 1910, p. 1–34.
- John Percival Droop: Droop Cups and the Dating of Laconian Pottery, in: Journal of Hellenic Studies 52, 1932, p. 303–304.
- Percy N. Ure: Droop Cups, in: Journal of Hellenic Studies 52, 1932, p. 55–71.
- Percy N. Ure: Droop Cups, Black and Figured, in: Studies presented to David M. Robinson II, 1953, p. 45–
- John Boardman: Schwarzfigurige Vasen aus Athen. Ein Handbuch, Mainz 1977, ISBN 3-8053-0233-9, p. 68–69.
- Berthold Fellmann: in: Kunst der Schale – Kultur des Trinkens, München 1990, p. 23–24. 39–40.
