= Taleides Painter =

Ancient Greek vase painter

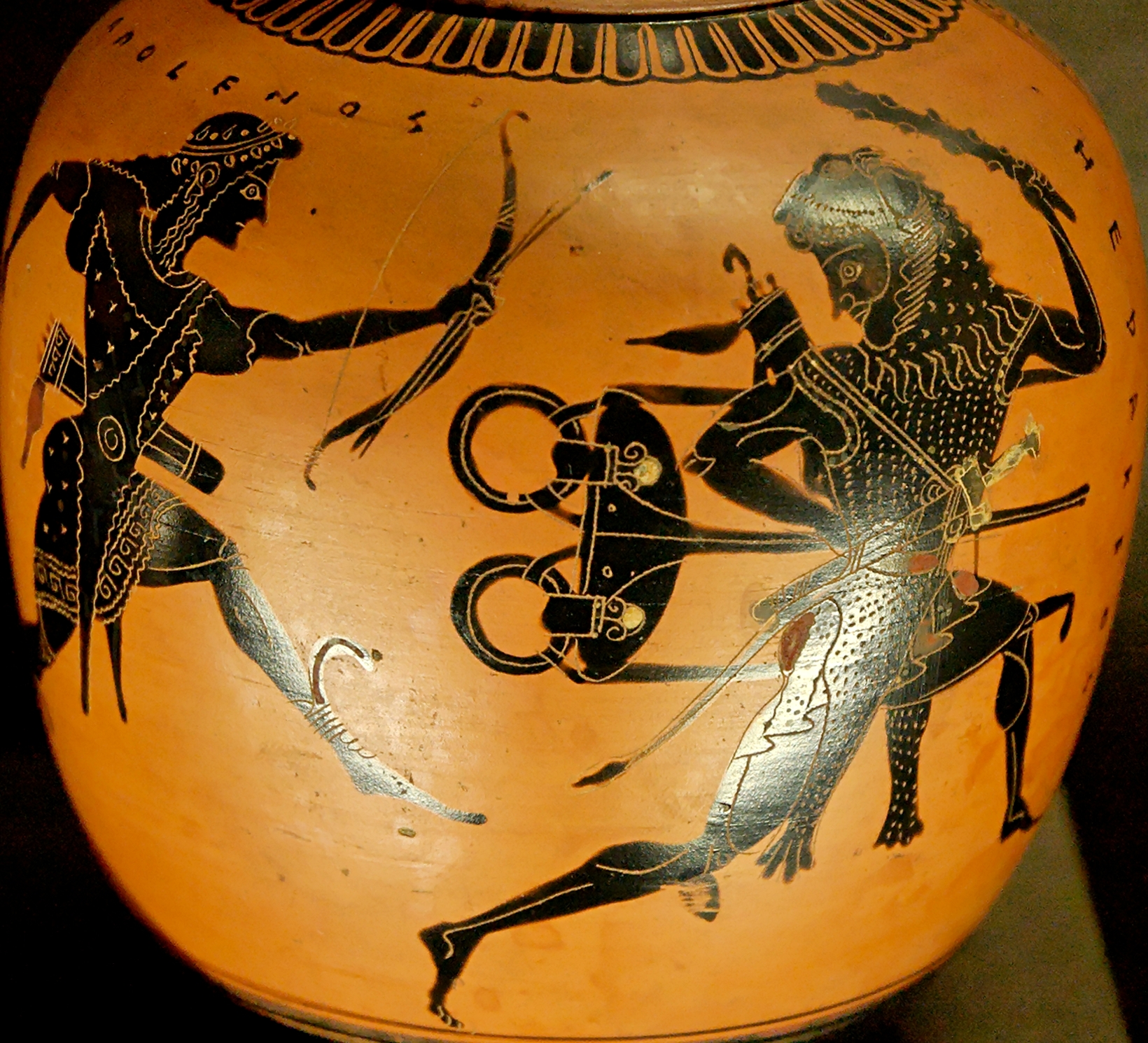
- Oinochoe, ca. 520 BC, Herakles and Apollo struggling for a tripod at Delphi
- Born: Unknown. Named from his collaboration with the potter, Taleides; About 550 BC
- Died: About 500 BC
- Known for: Vase painting
- Notable work: He painted vases for the potters Taleides and Timagoras
- Movement: Black-figure style

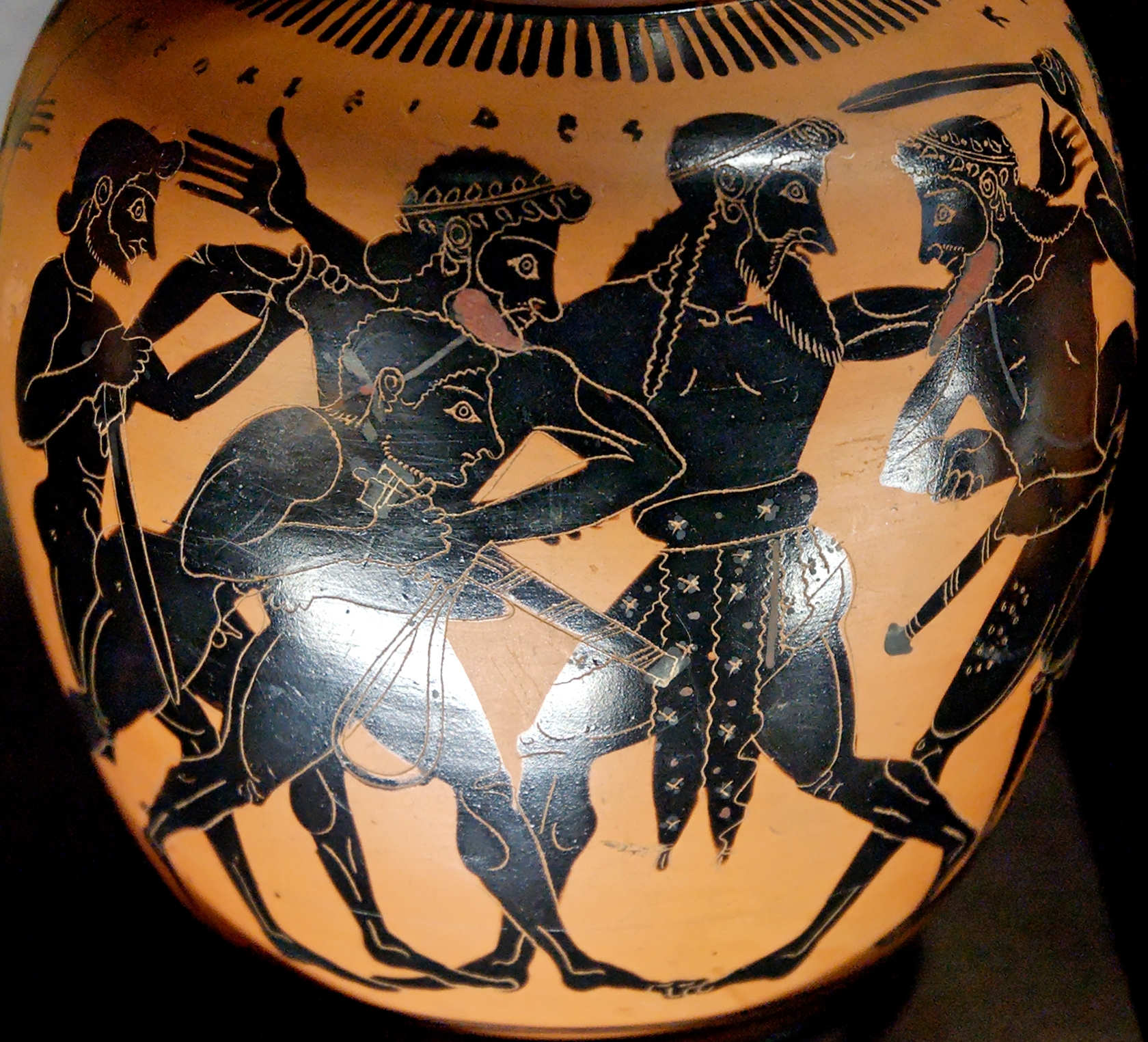
Oinochoe, ca 520 BC, Ajax and Odysseus fighting over the armour of Achilles

The Taleides Painter was an Attic vase painter of the black-figure style, active in the second half of the 6th century BC. His conventional name is derived from his close cooperation with the potter Taleides, many of whose vases he painted. He also worked for the potter Timagoras.

== Works (selection) ==
- Athens, Akropolis Museum

fragment of a loutrophoros

- Athens, National Museum

lekythos 414

- Berlin, Antikensammlung

Little-master cup F 1721 • psykter-oinochoe 31131

- Borden Wood, Collection Mrs. Winifred Lamb

lekythos

- Boston, Museum of Fine Arts

oinochoe 10.210 • amphora 63.952 • hydria 68.105 • hydria 99.522

- Brunswick, Bowdoin College

fragment 2

- Eleusis, Archaeological Museum

lekythos 961

- Hamburg, Museum für Kunst und Gewerbe

amphora 1917.474

- Limenas, Museum

cup fragment

- Madrid, Museo Arqueológico Nacional

oinochoe 10932 (L 55)

- Malibu, The J. Paul Getty Museum

lekythos 76.AE.48

- Munich, Antikensammlung

lekythos

- Oxford, Ashmolean Museum

fragment of a lekythos G 571

- Paris, Musée National du Louvre

hydria Cp10655 • ‚hydria F 38 • ‚hydria F 39 • Oinochoe F 340 • oinochoe F 341

- Rome, Museo Nazionale di Villa Giulia

amphora 15538 • Lekythos M 556

- St. Petersburg, Hermitage

hydria 4467

- Sydney, University, Nicholson Museum

fragment of a lekythos 48.284 (former Borden Wood, Collection Mrs. Winifred Lamb)

- Syracuse, Museo Archeologico Regionale Paolo Orsi

fragment of a Little-master cup 7354 • lekythos 8276

- Taranto, Museo Archeologico Nazionale

lekythos 117183

- Vatican, Museo Gregoriano Etrusco

Little-master cup Albizatti 321
Little-master cup 39546 (formerly Guglielmi collection)

== Bibliography ==
- John Beazley: Attic Black-Figure Vase-Painters, Oxford 1956, p. 174-176.
- John Beazley: Paralipomena. Additions to Attic black-figure vase-painters and to Attic red-figure vase-painters, Oxford 1971, p. 72-74.
- Peter Heesen: Taleides, in: Künstlerlexikon der Antike Vol. 2, 2004, p. 431-432.
