= Band cup =

Type of ancient Greek cup

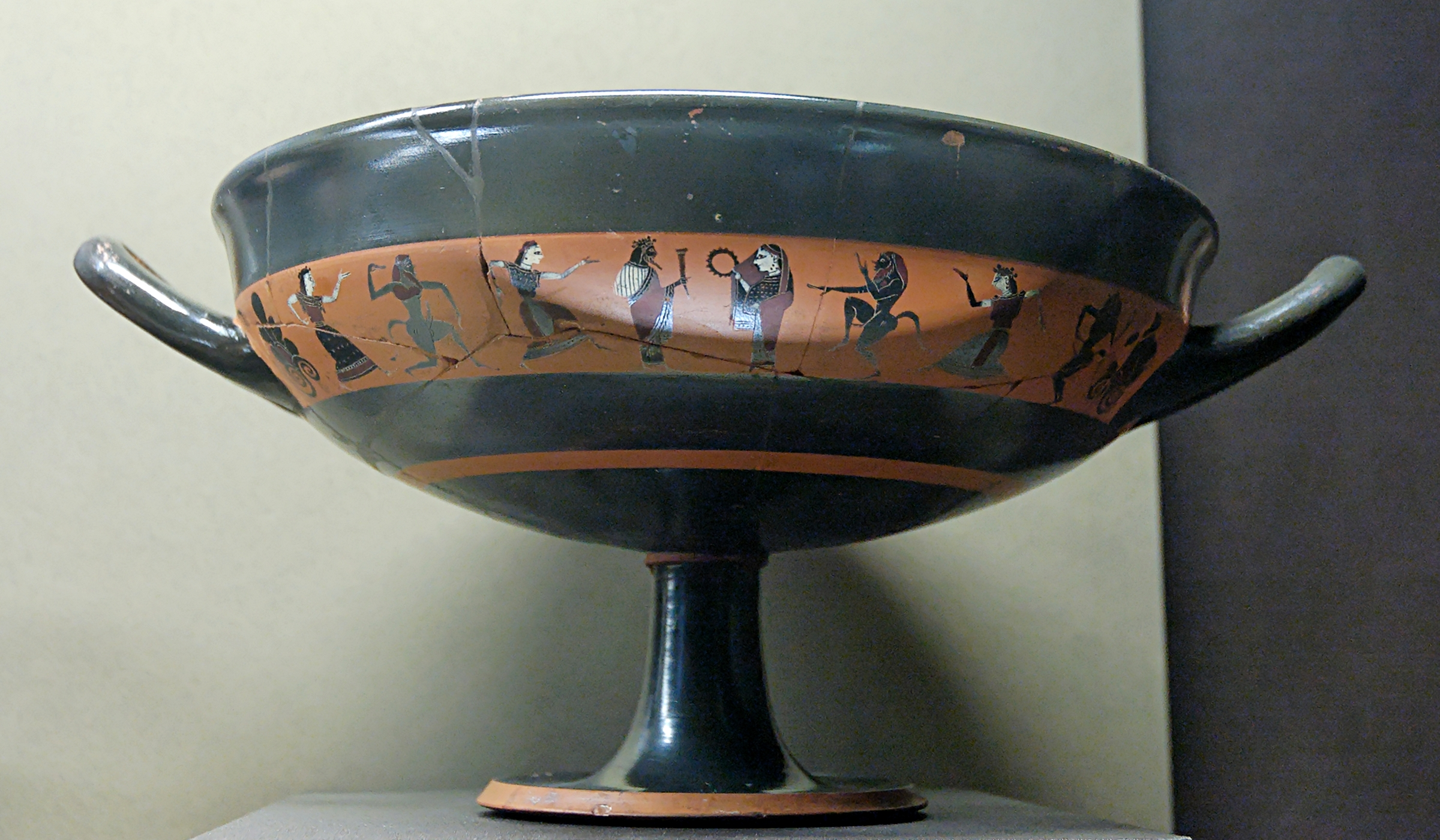
Band cup, potted by Amasis, painted by the Amasis Painter. Dionysos, Ariadne, satyrs and maenads, '’circa’’ 550/540 BC, Louvre.

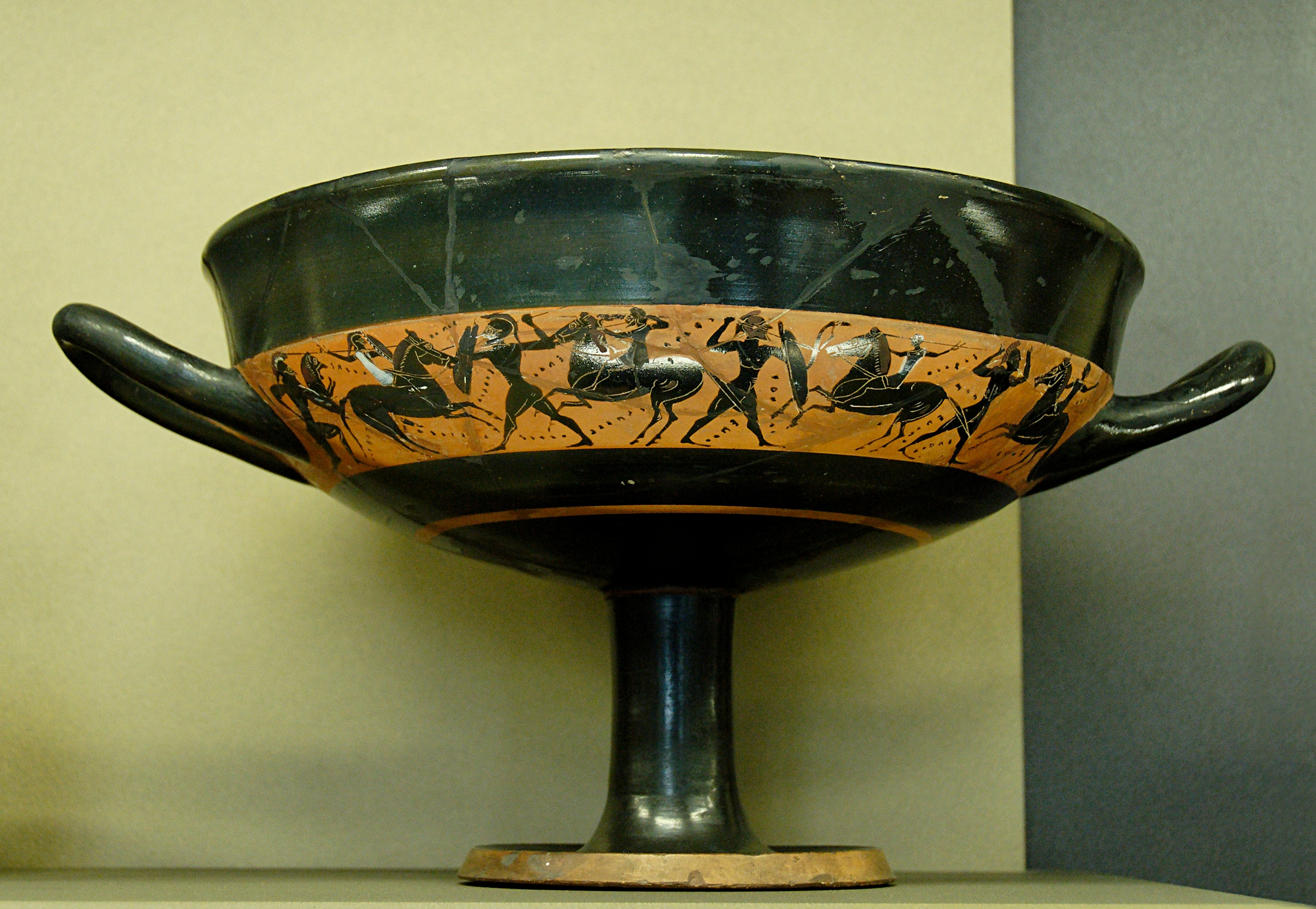
Battle scene on a band cup by an unknown artist, '’circa’’ 540 BC, Louvre.

Band cups are a form of ancient Greek Attic Little-master cups.

The lip of a band cup is black and slightly concave. At the joint between vase body and foot, there is often a red ring. The external figural decoration is in the area of the handles, often framed by palmettes. Internal images and inscriptions are quite rare. Some specimens are completely black with the exception of some figures near the handles. Another very rare group of specimens, attributed to the potter Andokides and his workshop, have figural decoration on the flat base of the foot.

It remains unknown why band cups and lip cups existed side by side for a considerable period. Perhaps, each variant had its own distinctive advantages. For example, it may have been more pleasant to drink from the undecorated black-slipped lip of a band cup, while the strong ridge underneath the rim of lip cups would have prevented spilling more effectively. Lip cups were somewhat more difficult to produce.

Well-known artists of this type were Hermogenes, Glaukytes, the Centaur Painter, Neandros, Sokles and the Oakeshott Painter. The differences amongst these cups can be found through their varying sizes and decorated imagery; these unique characteristics were influenced by the workshops they were created in rather than a set formula for the cup design.

== See also ==
- Athenian Band Cup by the Oakeshott Painter (MET 17.230.5)

== Bibliography ==
- John Boardman: Schwarzfigurige Vasen aus Athen. Ein Handbuch, Mainz 1977, ISBN 3-8053-0233-9, p. 66
