= Little-Master cup =

Type of Ancient Greek cup

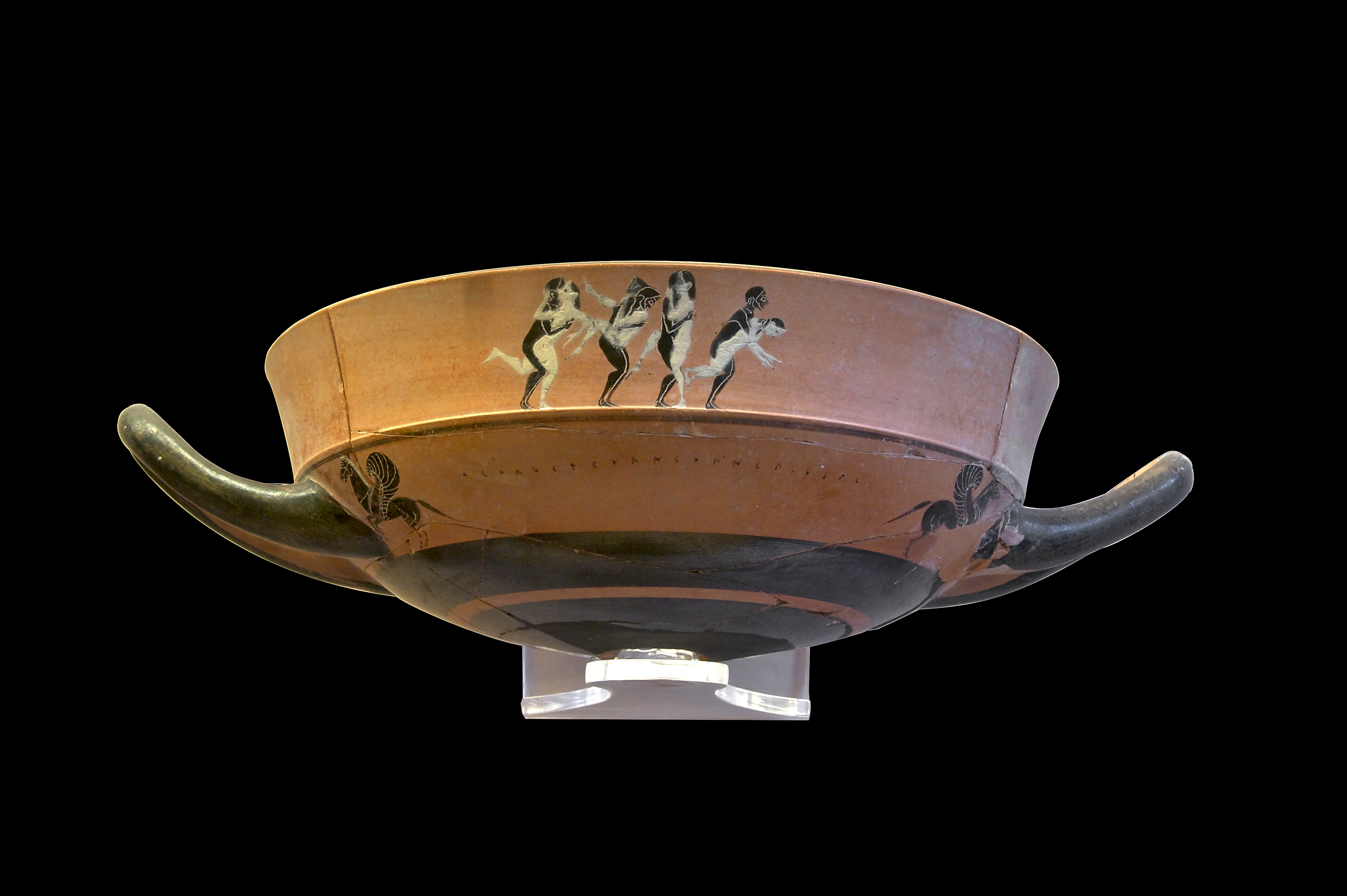
Lip cup with scenes of sex, Rhodes, 550–40 BC (stem and foot lost)

Little-Master cups are a type of Attic black-figure cups, produced around the middle and third quarter of the sixth century BC. Their name is based on their fine small-format decoration. Little-Master cups are later in origin than Siana cups, but both types were produced over a considerable period of time. The Little Masters painted only the small upper frieze above the carination of the cup, at times also the lip or handle areas. It is probably that only few of the painters of Siana cups also painted Little-Master cups. One of the first artists to introduce the Little-Master cup in Athens was Kleitias. The change in decoration went along with a lengthening of the cup foot. The dedicated painters of Little-Master cups rarely painted larger formats, whereas painters primarily specialised in large vases are known to have also painted Little-Master cups. Stylistic comparison between larger and smaller formats of the period remains difficult.

Many Little-Master cups are signed (especially lip cups), as the signature was often incorporated in the overall decor. The signatures are mostly by potters, probably because the potting was often of higher quality than the painting.

== Types as well as related shapes and derivatives ==
Several types of Little-Master cups are known:

- Band cups
- Droop cups
- Gordion cups
- Kassel cups
- Lip cups
- Band skyphoi

== Gallery ==
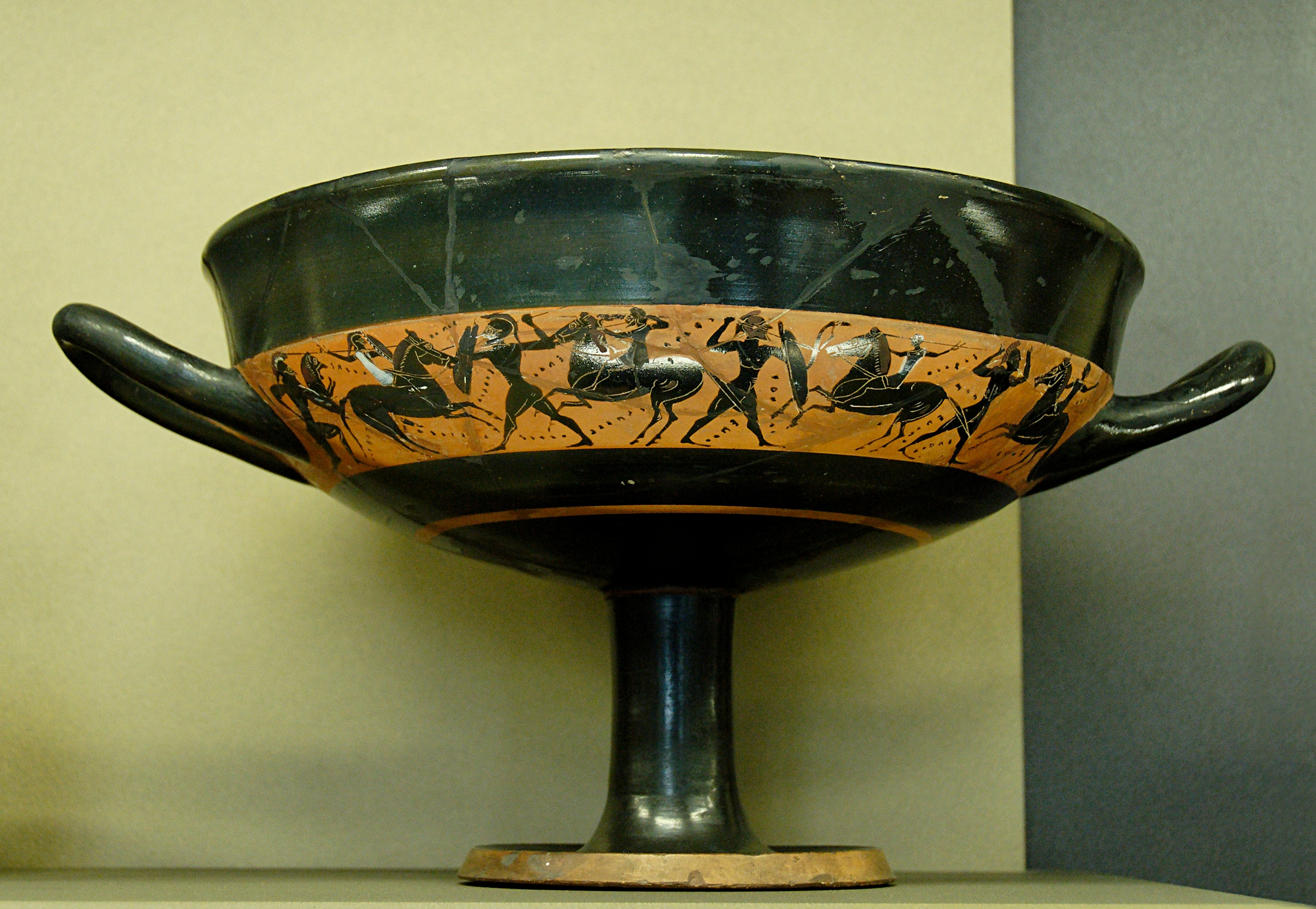
Band cup by an unknown Attic artist, c. 540 BC. Louvre.

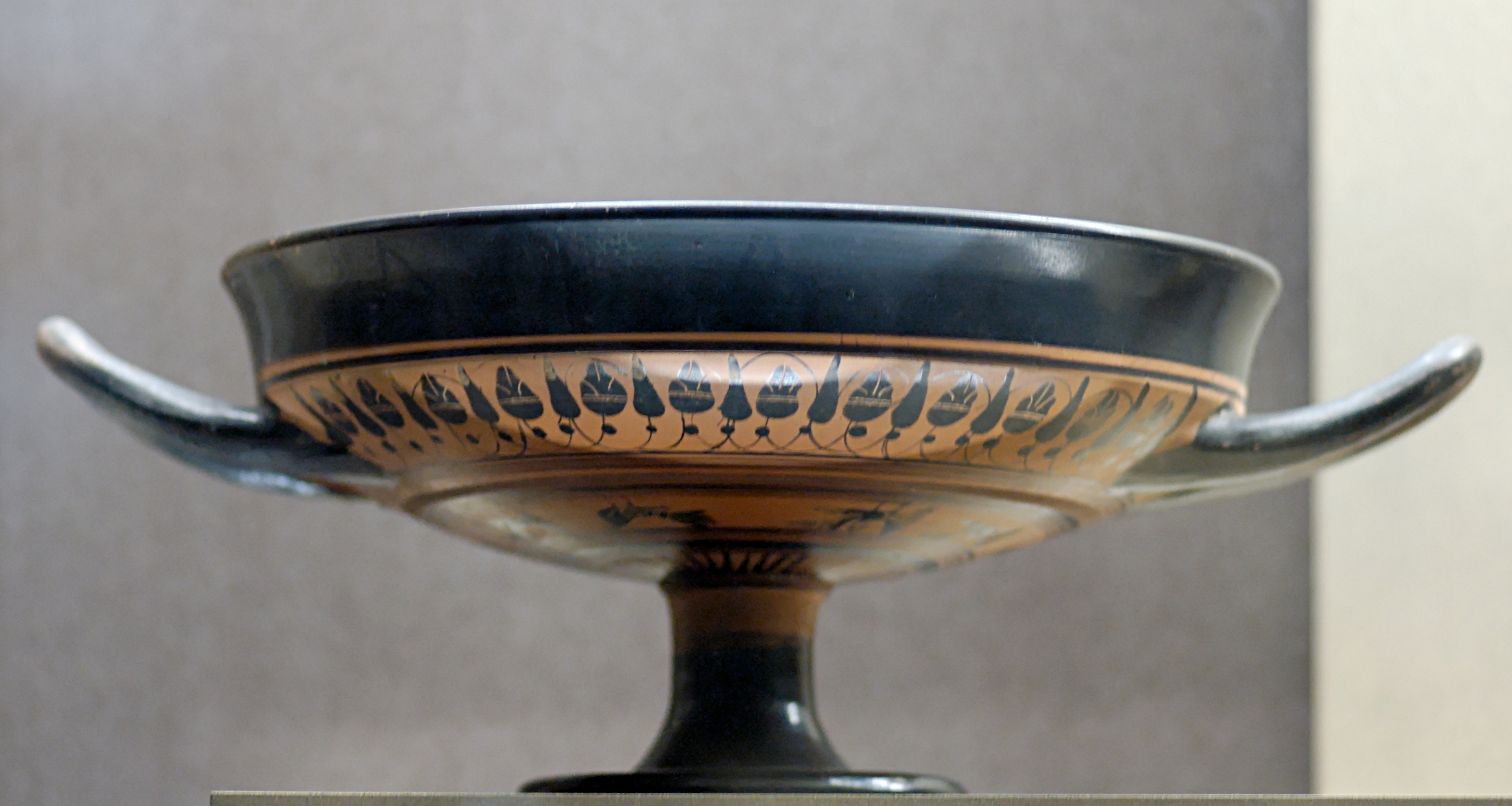
Droop Cup by an unknown Attic artist, c. 550–30 BC. Louvre.

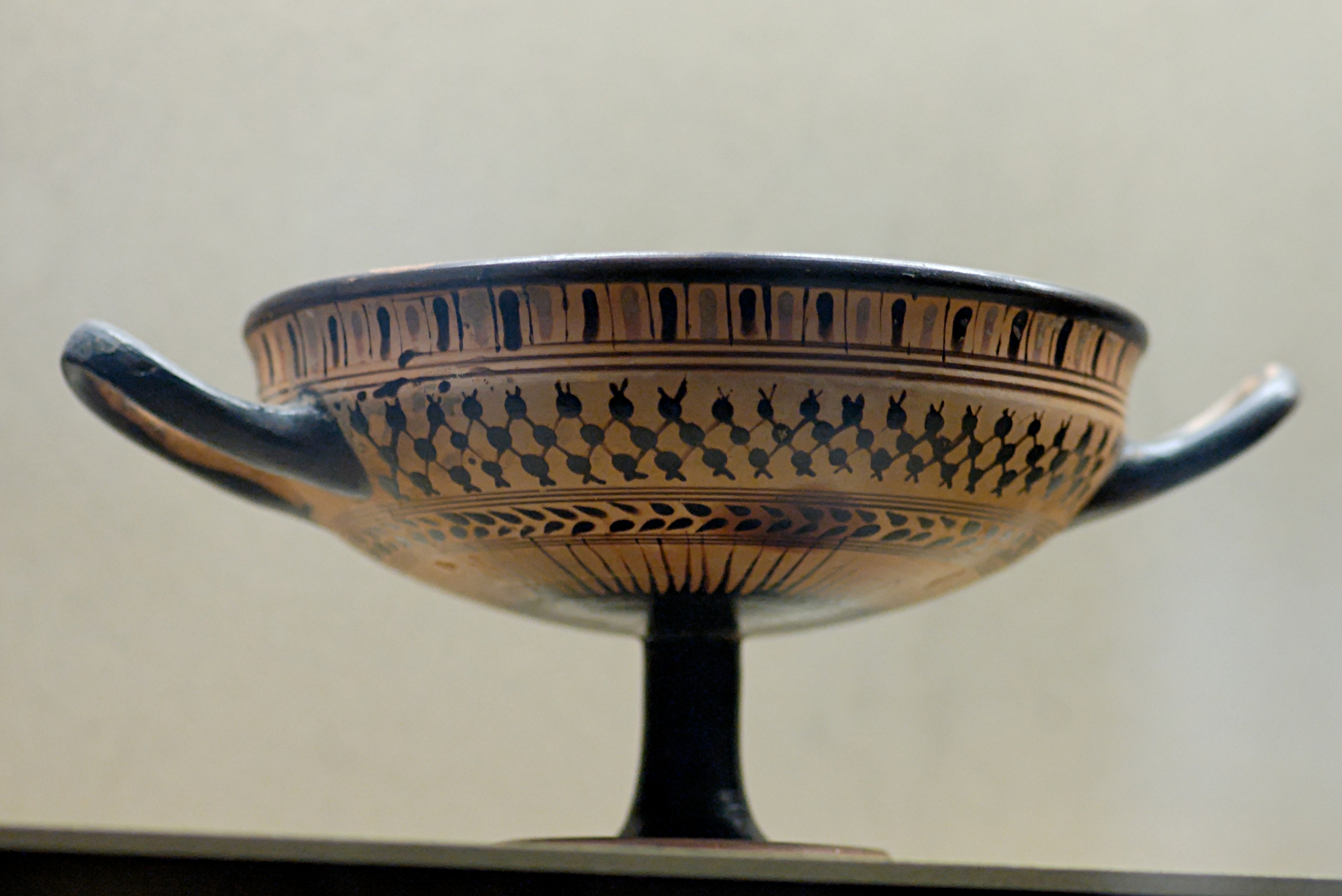
Kassel Cup by an unknown Attic artist, c. 540 BC. Louvre.

== Bibliography ==
- John Beazley: Little-master Cups, in: The Journal of Hellenic Studies 52 (1932), p. 167-204.
- John D. Beazley: Attic Black-figure Vase-Painting, Oxford 1956, p. 159-197.
- Dieter Metzler: Eine attische Kleinmeisterschale mit Töpferszenen in Karlsruhe, in: Archäologischer Anzeiger (1969), p. 138-152.
- John D. Beazley: Paralipomena. Additions to Attic black-figure vase-painters and to Attic red-figure vase-painters, Oxford 1971, p. 67-80.
- Joan Tarlow Haldenstein: Little master cups. Studies in 6th century Attic black-figure vase painting, Dissertation University of Cincinnati 1975.
- Heide Mommsen: Kleinmeister-Schalen, in: Der Neue Pauly, Vol. 6, 1999, Col. 563
- Rudolf Wachter: Drinking inscriptions on Attic little-master cups. A catalogue (AVI 3), in: Kadmos 42 (2003), p. 141-189.
- Peter Heesen: Drinking inscriptions on Attic little-master cups. Does size matter? A contribution to the AVI Project, in: Museum Helveticum 63 (2006), p. 44-62.
