= Marcon =

Marcon may refer to:

- Marcon, Veneto, a comune in the province of Venice, in the Veneto region of northern Italy
- Marcon (surname), a list of people surnamed Marcon
- Marcon Bezzina (born 1985), a Maltese judoka
- Marçon, a commune in the Sarthe department in the region of Pays-de-la-Loire in north-western France

== See also ==
- Macron (disambiguation)
- MarsCon (disambiguation), two separate, unaffiliated science fiction conventions
