= Brygos Painter =

Ancient Greek vase painter

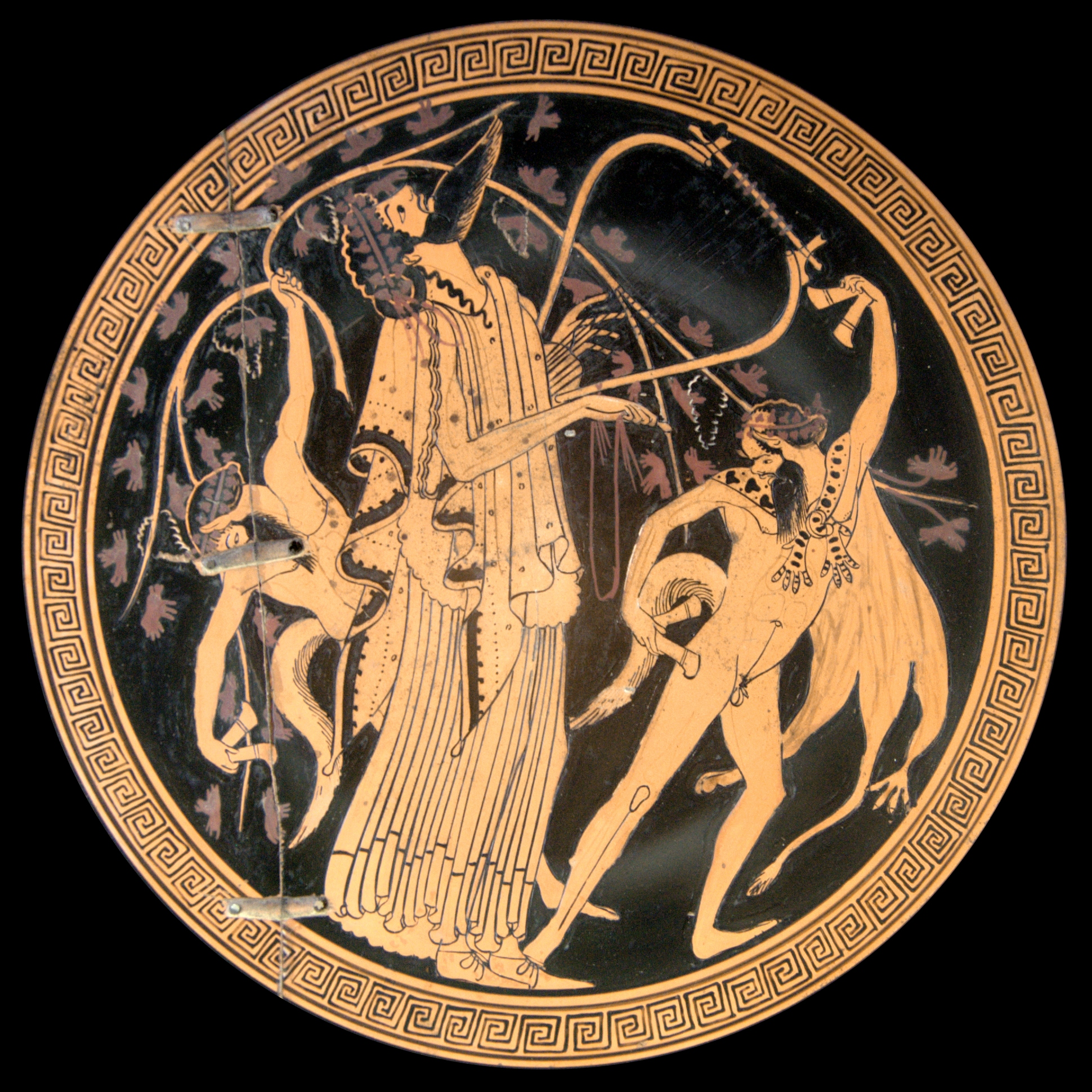
- Red-figure kylix by the Brygos Painter (c. 480 BC), Staatliche Antikensammlungen, Munich
- Born: c. 490–470 BC; Athens, Greece
- Notable work: Brygos Cup
- Movement: Red-figure, Late Archaic–Early Classical

The Brygos Painter was an ancient Greek Attic red-figure vase painter of the Late Archaic period. Together with Onesimos, Douris and Makron, he is among the most important cup painters of his time. He was active in the first third of the 5th century BCE, especially in the 480s and 470s BCE. He was a prolific artist to whom over two hundred vases have been attributed, but he is perhaps best known for the Brygos Cup, a red-figure kylix in the Louvre which depicts the "iliupersis" or sack of Troy.

== The name Brygos ==
The artist’s notname is derived from several cups painted in a distinctive style and bearing the signature “Brygos.” This inscription, currently present on sixteen vessels (some complete pieces and some fragments), is often accompanied by the word epoiesen. This suggests that the name refers to the potter or maker, rather than the painter, whose name would likely be followed by the word egrapsen. Some scholars persist in believing that the Brygos designation suggests that the painter and potter are one and the same; however, this seems problematic given the presence of the signature on a handful of vessels that were not painted by the Brygos Painter, but rather were decorated by other contemporary artists. This would imply that indeed the name of Brygos most likely belongs to the potter who fashioned the matrices on which the unnamed painter created his masterpieces. More likely, there was a partnership in place that resulted in Brygos forming the vessels with the Brygos Painter providing the illustrations. Nevertheless, the name “Brygos Painter” has been used by scholars since P. Hartwig as a means to outline a single master’s style and artistic production.

== Excavated works ==
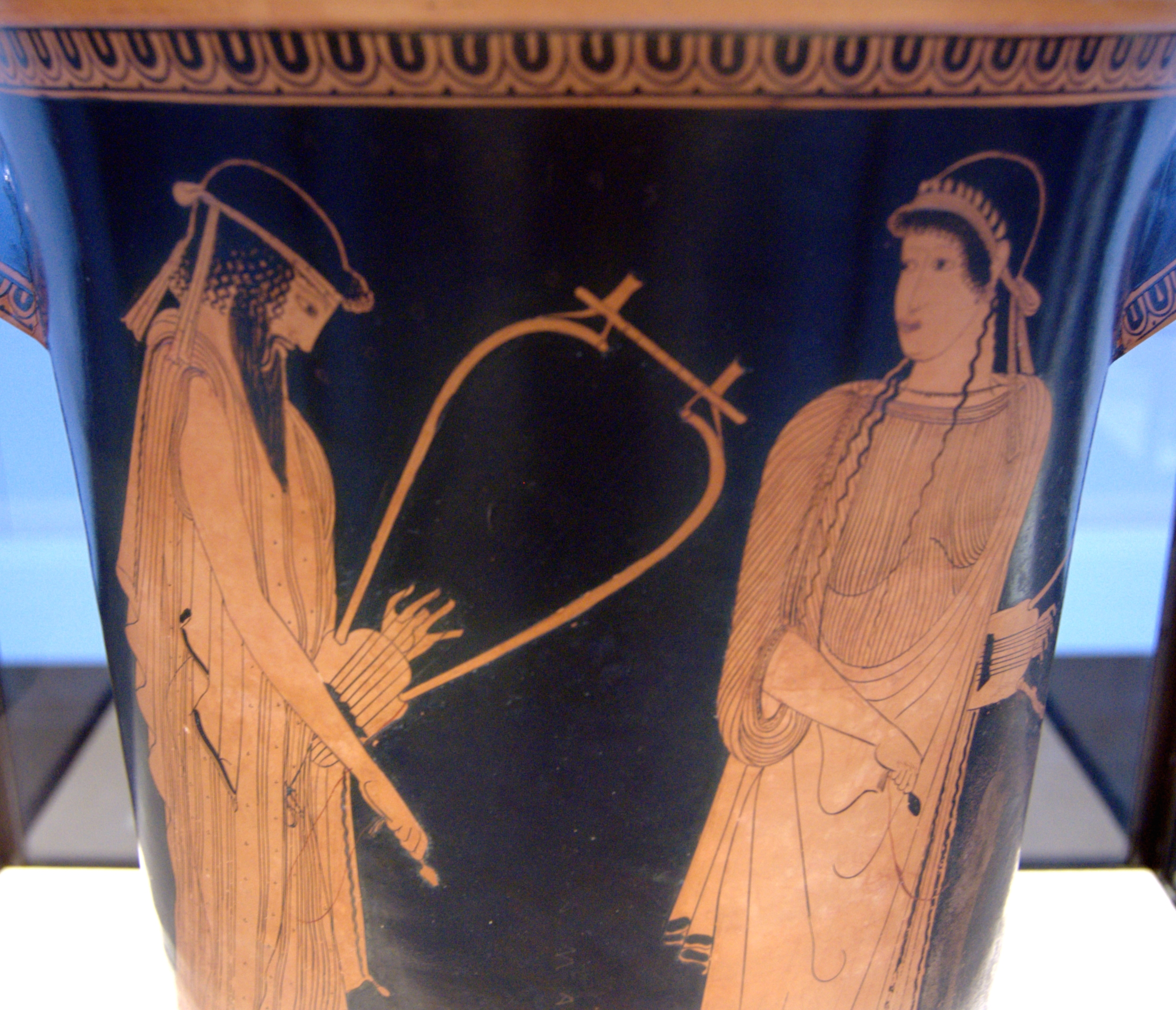
Alcaeus and Sappho, Side A of an Attic red-figure calathus, ca. 470 BC. From Akragas, Staatliche Antikensammlungen

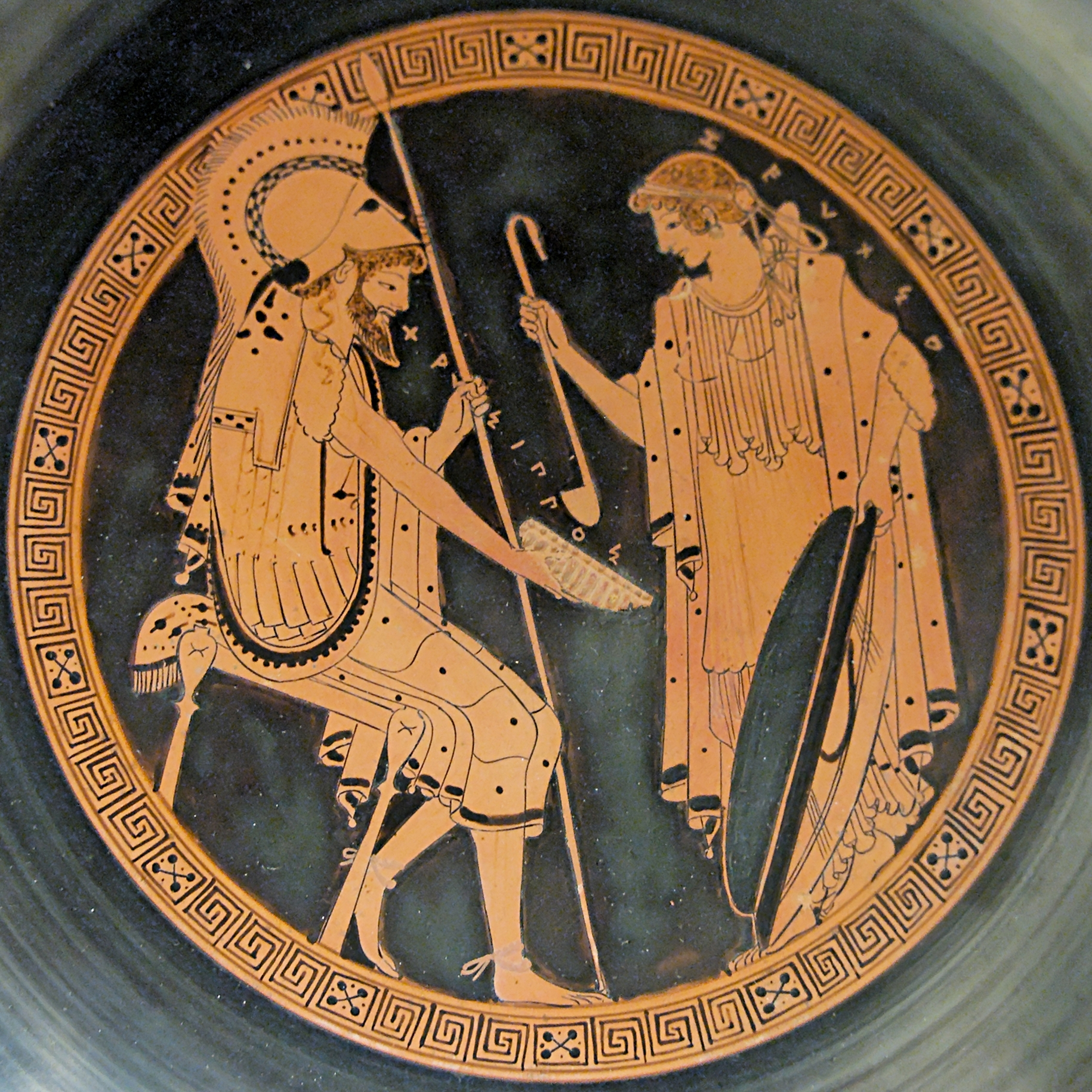
Zeuxo and Chrysippos, tondo of a red-figure kylix, c. 490/480 BCE. From the "Brygos Tomb" (Tomb II), Capua. London, British Museum.

In the 19th century CE, a magnificent red-figure kylix bearing the Brygos signature and painted in the style of the artist now known as the Brygos Painter was discovered in a 5th-century BCE tomb in Capua, leading John Beazley to dub the tomb (Tomb II) the “Brygos Tomb." A fragment of a plate depicting a reveler, painted by the Brygos Painter, was found on the Athenian Acropolis. Its burned exterior and excavation alongside remnants of marble architecture indicate it was part of the debris from the Persian destruction of the site, giving it a terminus ante quem of 480 BCE. Otherwise, the majority of vases attributed to the painter have emerged on the international art market without archaeological context.

== Forms and output ==
The Brygos Painter was one of the most productive painters of his generation; more than 200 vases have been attributed to him. Apart from kylikes, he also painted other vase shapes, such as skyphoi, kantharoi, rhyta, a calathus-like vessel with a pouring spout and a number of lekythoi. By far the majority of his works were kylikes of the types B and C. The latter were often executed without maeander base lines; the former frequently stood on conical bases. The meanders around his tondo paintings are rarely continuous, most are interrupted by sets or rows of crosses. Apart from his red-figure work, the Brygos Painter is known to have produced some white-ground vases.

== Style and artistry ==
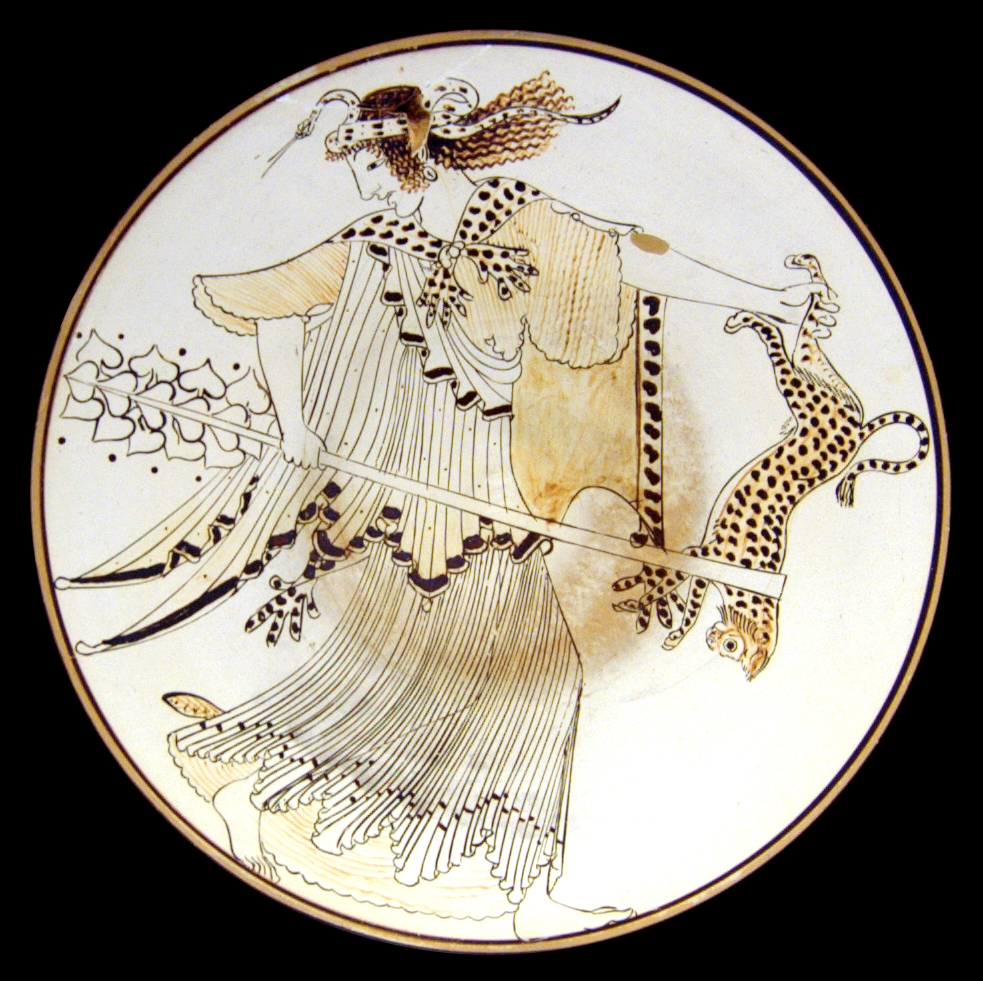
Raging maenad. She holds a thyrsos in her right hand, her left is swinging a panther through the air. A snake is winding through the diadem in her hair. Tondo of a white-ground kylix, 490-480 BCE. Munich, Staatliche Antikensammlungen.

The Brygos Painter seems to be one of the earliest red-figure artists who were not in direct contact with the so-called Pioneers. His teacher appears to have been Onesimos, as his style is derived from the earlier work of that master, and their periods of production run parallel. Typical subjects are symposium and palaistra scenes, such as the Brygos cup of Würzburg, depicting a man vomiting after a symposium.

His figures are characterized by wearing garments such as cloaks often featuring scattered dots, as well as flat-topped heads, long noses, and narrow eyes with high, arching eyebrows. While his drawing is not always of the utmost precision, the postures of his figures and the expressiveness of their faces are remarkable. He is also one of the first, and very few, painters who managed to paint a child to look truly like a child, and not like a small adult. Many of his figures also clearly display the effects of age. Stubbly beards or stubbly hair (on old men), as well as signs of balding, are also typical. His skill in painting the human mouth is exceptional: his figures are shown whistling, singing, playing the flute or clenching their lips with a high degree of anatomical accuracy. All this indicates the Brygos Painter was a skilled observer of human emotion, expression, and interaction.

His renderings of mythological scenes are frequently original. Thus, he depicts the body of Ajax being covered by his concubine Tecmessa, the handing-over of the body of Hector and other scenes from the Trojan War. Dionysiac scenes are common as well. A famous kylix depicts satyrs attacking the goddesses Iris and Hera. While Iris attempts to flee, Hera is protected by Heracles and Hermes. Dionysos is present, but apparently uninvolved. As on many of the Brygos Painter's vases, the figures are named by inscription; at times he even indicates what they say. In spite of his frequent use of writing, kalos inscriptions by the Brygos Painter are rare.

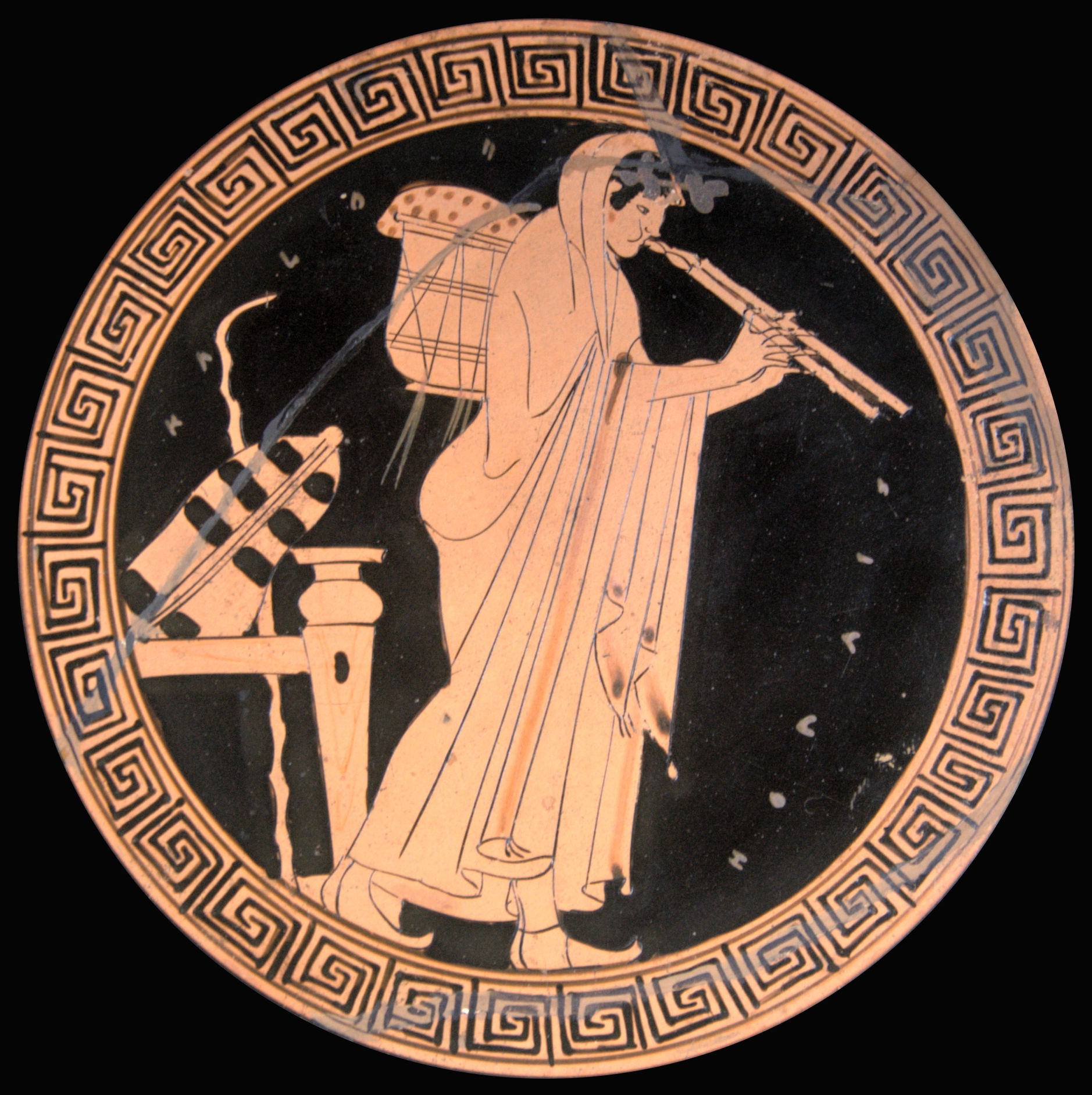
Aulos player, tondo of a red-figure kylix, c. 490 BCE. Paris, Louvre.

The Brygos Painter was associated with a broader circle of artists who were influenced by him or may even have worked with him at the studio of the potter Brygos. These include the Foundry Painter, the Briseis Painter, the Dokimasia Painter, the Painter of Louvre G 265 and the Painter of the Paris Gigantomachy. While the Brygos Painter's work spans only a period of approximately twenty years, it has been said to demonstrate what many describe as an exciting, innovative, and spirited beginning with a decline in the later years of his career, characterized by weaker work. This argument, however, assumes that “weaker work” is the product of old age rather than inexperience or even another painter. Indeed, Beazley notes that it is often difficult to determine if a piece is late-Brygan or a simply school piece of another artist emulating his style.

== See also ==
- Brygos
- List of Greek vase painters
- Art in ancient Greece
- Pottery of ancient Greece

== Bibliography ==
- John D. Beazley. Attic Red-Figure Vase-Painters. Oxford: Clarendon Press, 1963.
- John Boardman. Rotfigurige Vasen aus Athen. Die archaische Zeit. Philipp von Zabern, 4. Auflage, Mainz 1994 (Kulturgeschichte der Antiken Welt, Vol 4), esp p. 149–151, ISBN 3-8053-0234-7.
- Alexander Cambitoglou. The Brygos Painter. Sydney: Sydney University Press for Australian Humanities Research Council, 1968.
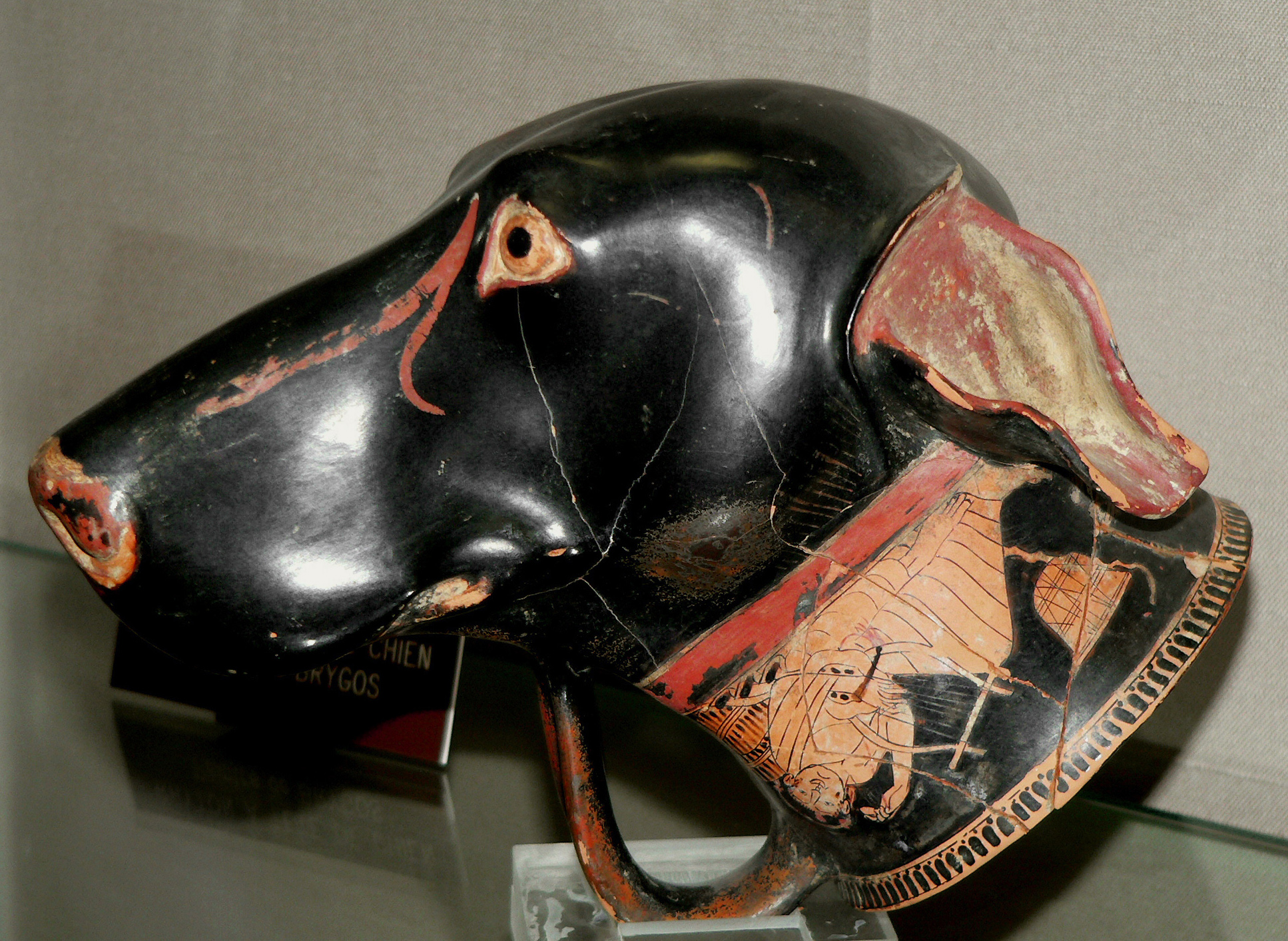
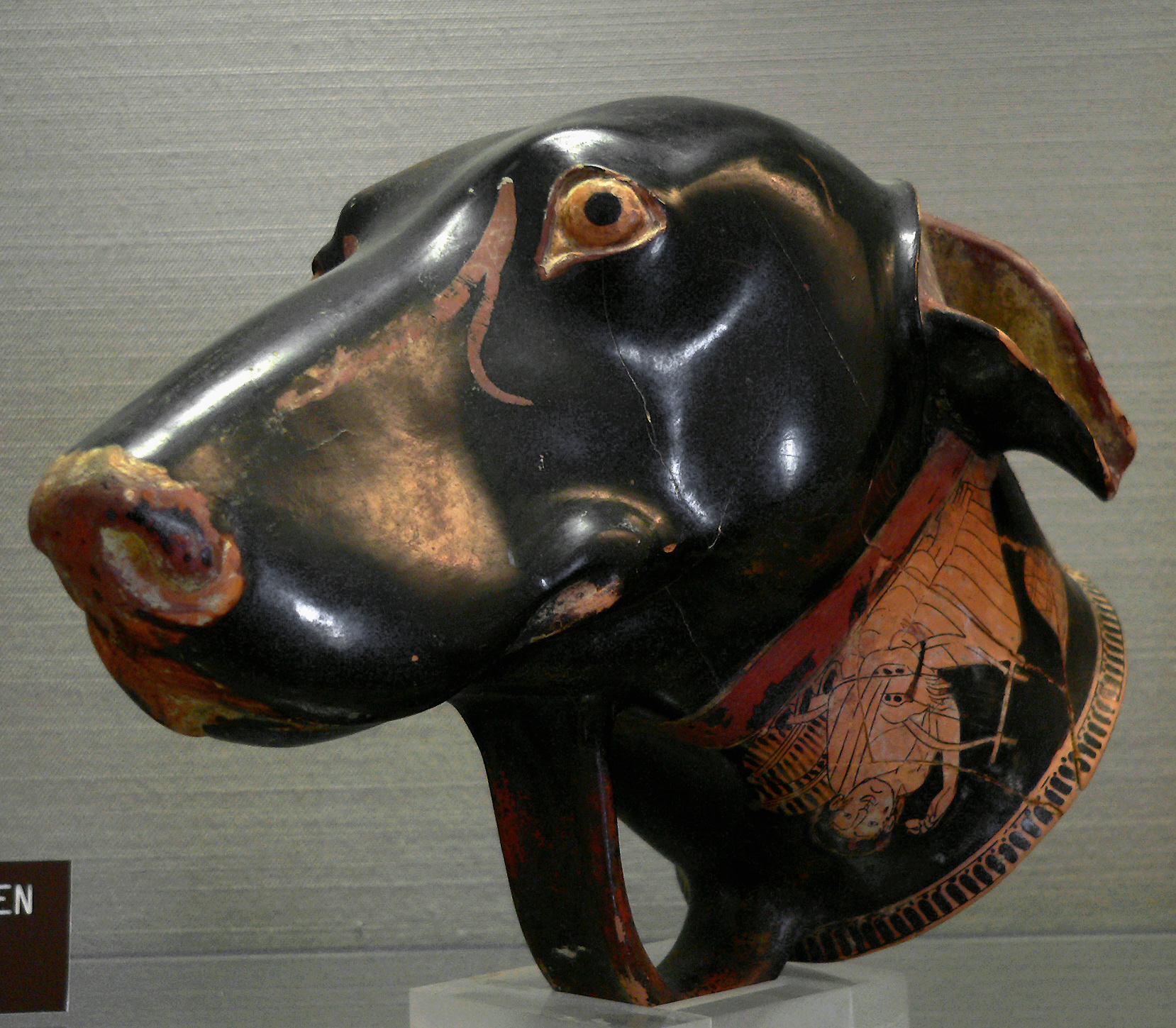
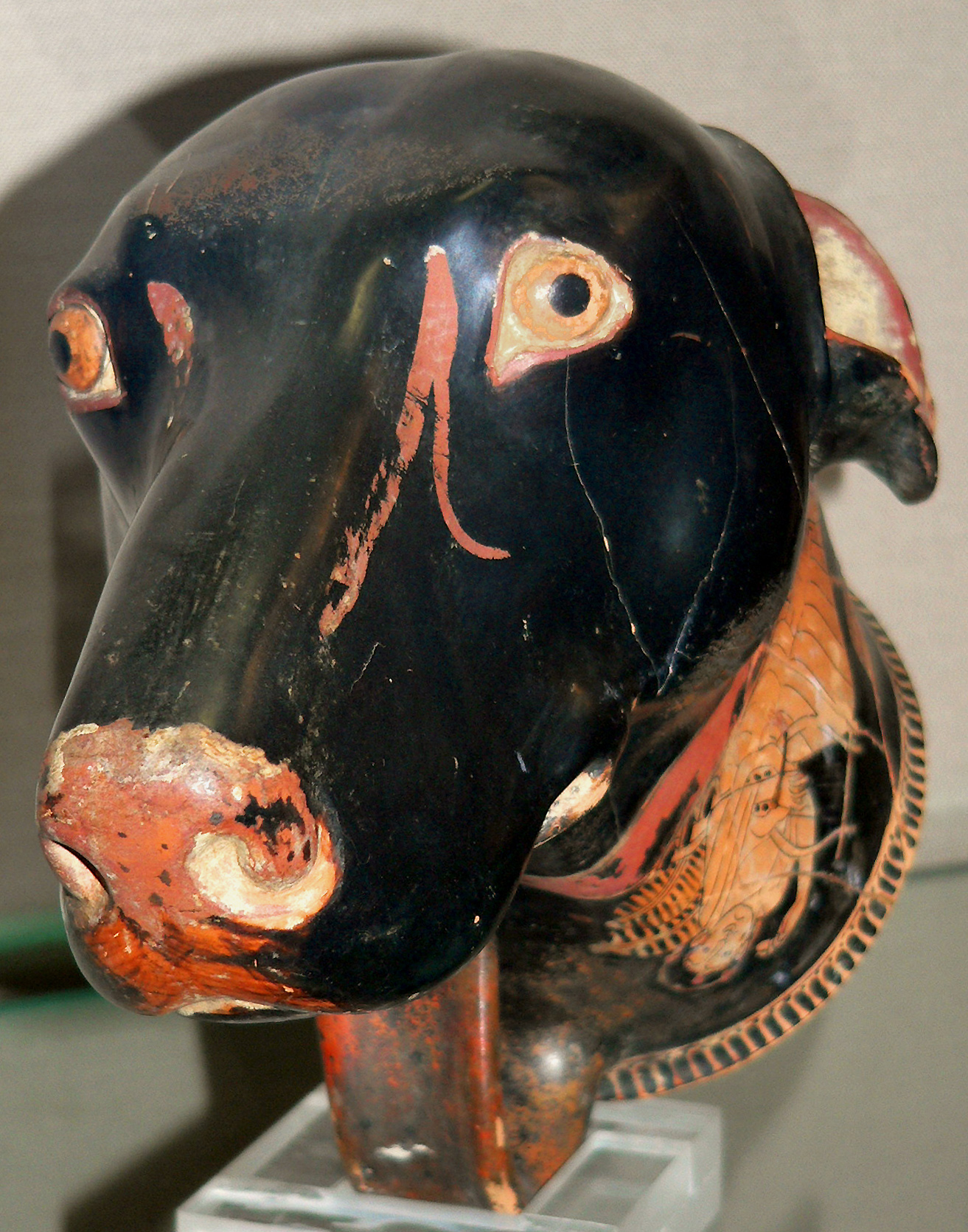
Rhyton in the shape of a dog's head, made by Brygos and thought to have been painted by the Brygos Painter, early 5th century BCE. Jérôme Carcopino Museum, Department of Archaeology, Aleria

*The Getty Museum - Biography of the Brygos Painter Working in Athens in the early 400s B.C., the Brygos Painter was a prolific decorator of red-figure cups. Over two hundred vases have been attributed to him, including a limited number of shapes other than cups and some vessels in the white-ground technique. Having learned his craft from Onesimos, the Brygos Painter was himself quite influential and was the center of a large circle of painters. The Brygos Painter painted both genre and mythological scenes, being especially fond of depictions of symposia, athletes, and Achilles. His treatments of mythological scenes were often innovative, and he was also rather stylistically experimental. He had a greater interest in spatial effects and setting than did his contemporaries. By using dilute glaze washes to show three-dimensionality, his painting technique comes close to shading. As with most Greek vase-painters, the real name of the Brygos Painter is unknown, and he is identified only by the stylistic traits of his work. He is named after the potter Brygos, with whom he worked. Some scholars think the painter and potter may be one and the same person.
