= Robert Horne (virologist) =

British virologist

Robert W. Horne (21 January 1923 – 13 November 2010) was a British virologist and expert in electron microscopy.

== Life and academic career ==
Horne was raised in Montreal and served in the Royal Air Force during the Second World War. He began his scientific career at the Cavendish Laboratory at the University of Cambridge, where he began working with transmission electron microscopes with Vernon Ellis Cosslett. He received his master's and doctorate from the University of Cambridge. In 1961, Horne moved to what was then the Institute of Animal Physiology (now the Babraham Institute), and in 1968 he moved again to what became the John Innes Centre, directed by Roy Markham. Horne remained there as a department head until retiring in 1982. He continued working after his retirement as an honorary professor at the University of East Anglia.

In addition to his scientific interests, Horne was a sailing enthusiast and an artist who focused on marine art.

== Research ==
Horne specialized in the use of electron microscopy to study viruses. In 1959, he and Sydney Brenner pioneered the technique of negative staining in electron microscopy and used it to study virus structure, beginning with bacteriophages. With Peter Wildy and Willie Russell, Horne applied the technique to study the herpes simplex virus and the geometry of its capsid. In the 1960s, Horne, André Michel Lwoff, and Paul Tournier developed early systems of viral taxonomy. His work with Alec Bangham on phospholipids contributed to the discovery of liposomes.

Horne wrote two books on virology and co-authored reference works in electron microscopy. He joined the editorial board of the journal Micron at its founding in 1969 and served as its editor-in-chief from 1978 to 1995.
