= Makron =

Makron may refer to:

- A town in Madhya Pradesh, India
- Makron (vase painter), Greek red-figure vase painter
- Makron, a boss character in Quake (series)

== See also ==
- Macron (disambiguation)
