= Brygos =

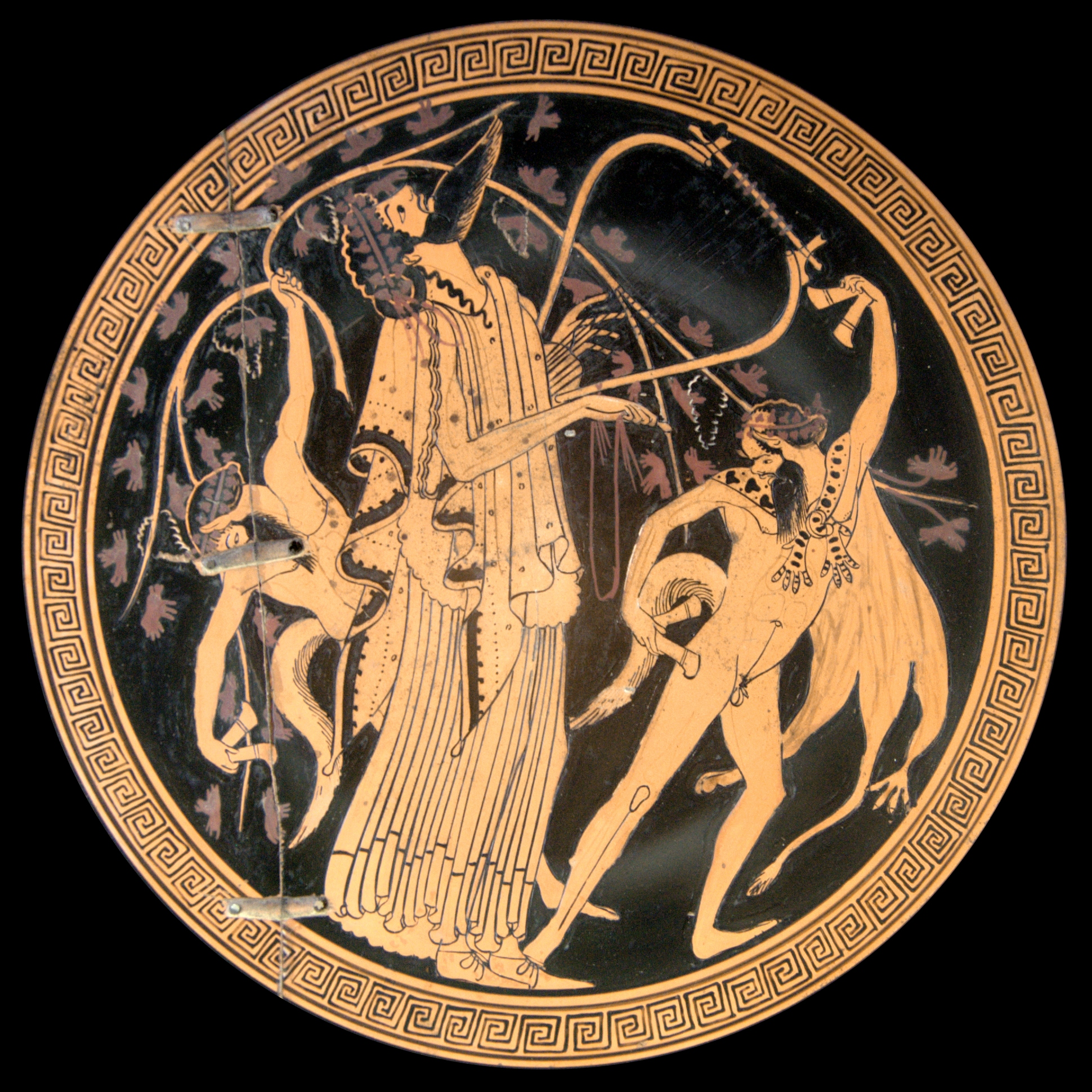
Dionysos and satyrs on a vase made by Brygos and painted by the Brygos Painter, ca. 480 BC (Cabinet des Médailles, Paris)

Brygos was a potter who is conventionally placed among the major Attic potters active around 490–470 BC, based on the dating of workshop vases and the stylistic chronology of red-figure pottery. The majority of surviving vessels associated with Brygos are kylikes, many of which depict scenes related to wine drinking or symposia. This suggests that Brygos’ workshop may have specialized especially in the production of symposium cups. Fourteen surviving drinking cups carry the inscription "Brygos made me" (ΒΡΥΓΟΣ ἘΠΟΙΕΣΕΝ), which indicates that his workshop mainly produced cups rather than other vessel types. Several vase painters worked for him, including the well known Brygos Painter, and the workshop played an important part in early Classical Athenian pottery.

== Workshop ==
Researchers identify Brygos as the head of an active workshop with more than one painter in early 5th century BC Athens. Cups linked to his workshop are thin, smooth, and well formed, which suggests high skill in clay preparation and throwing. The most famous artist who painted on Brygos cups is the Brygos Painter. His work features detailed figures and confident linework. Other painters who appear to have worked in the same workshop include the Briseis Painter and the Dokimasia Painter. The presence of works by several painters, including the Brygos Painter, the Briseis Painter, and the Dokimasia Painter, suggests that Brygos managed a workshop rather than painting the vessels himself.

== Brygos and the Brygos Painter ==
The name Brygos refers to the potter who produced red figure drinking cups in Athens in the early 5th century BC. The Brygos Painter is the name given by modern scholars to the painter who decorated many of these cups. Although they are closely connected, they are not the same individual. Early scholarship sometimes treated the two names as belonging to one person because pieces made by Brygos often featured paintings of very high quality. Around 200 vases are attributed to the Brygos Painter, but only fourteen surviving vessels are actually signed by Brygos as the potter. This difference helps explain the early assumption that Brygos both made and painted the cups, even though signatures and stylistic analysis do not support this. However, stylistic analysis does show that more than one painter worked on vessels produced in the Brygos workshop. Further support for separating the identities comes from the Brygos Tomb assemblage from Capua. Williams' reconstruction of the tomb group shows that more than one painter appears in association with pottery signed by Brygos, which makes it unlikely that the potter and the Brygos Painter were a single person. For these reasons, most scholars understand Brygos as the potter and the Brygos Painter as the most skilled artist who worked in his workshop.

== Signatures ==
At least twelve surviving cups carry the inscription "ΒΡΥΓΟΣ ἘΠΟΙΕΣΕΝ" meaning "Brygos made me".Tonks notes that the inscription is most often written on the underside of the foot of the cup, which was a common place for Athenian potters to sign their work at this time. The fact that nearly all signed vessels are cups suggests that this was the main product of his workshop.

== The Brygos Tomb ==
One important archaeological context connected with Brygos is the Brygos Tomb, which is a 5th-century BC burial found near Capua in southern Italy. A kylix cup with the Brygos signature was reportedly discovered there during 19th century excavations. Because of that cup and several other high quality pieces linked to artists in the Brygos workshop, Beazley called the grave "Tomb II" or the Brygos Tomb. In 1992, Williams' studied museum inventories and archival records to reconstruct the group of objects said to come from the tomb. He concluded that several cups made in the Brygos workshop were part of the original assemblage. These finds support the idea that Attic pottery was traded to southern Italy. Williams explains that the vessels linked to the Brygos Tomb were not documented at the time of discovery and were dispersed through the antiquities market in the 19th century. Because the objects were removed and sold without records of where they were placed or how they were associated with each other, the tomb assemblage has to be reconstructed using museum inventories and dealer archives rather than direct excavation notes. For this reason, the original contents of the burial cannot be verified with certainty.

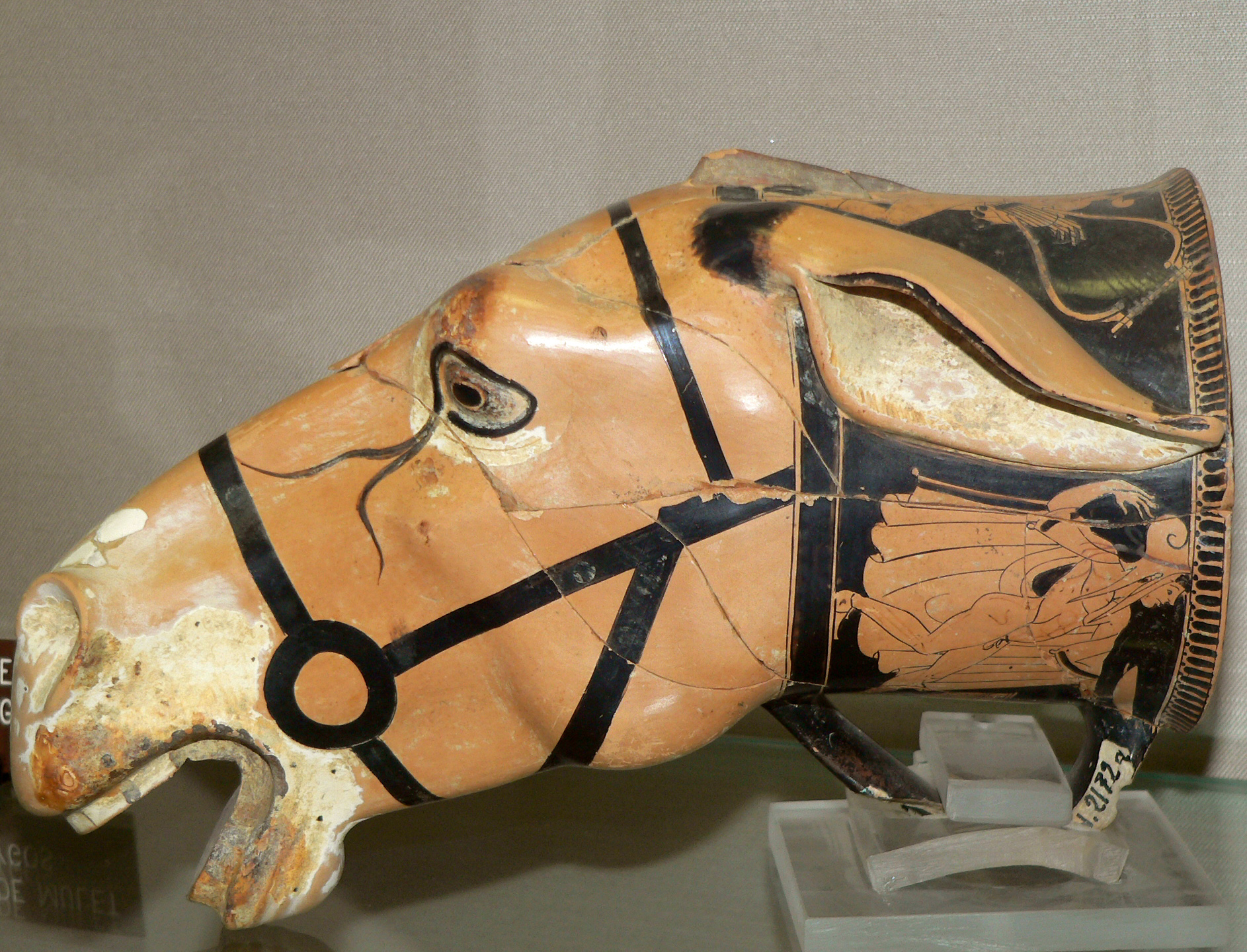
Rhyton in the shape of a mule's head made by Brygos

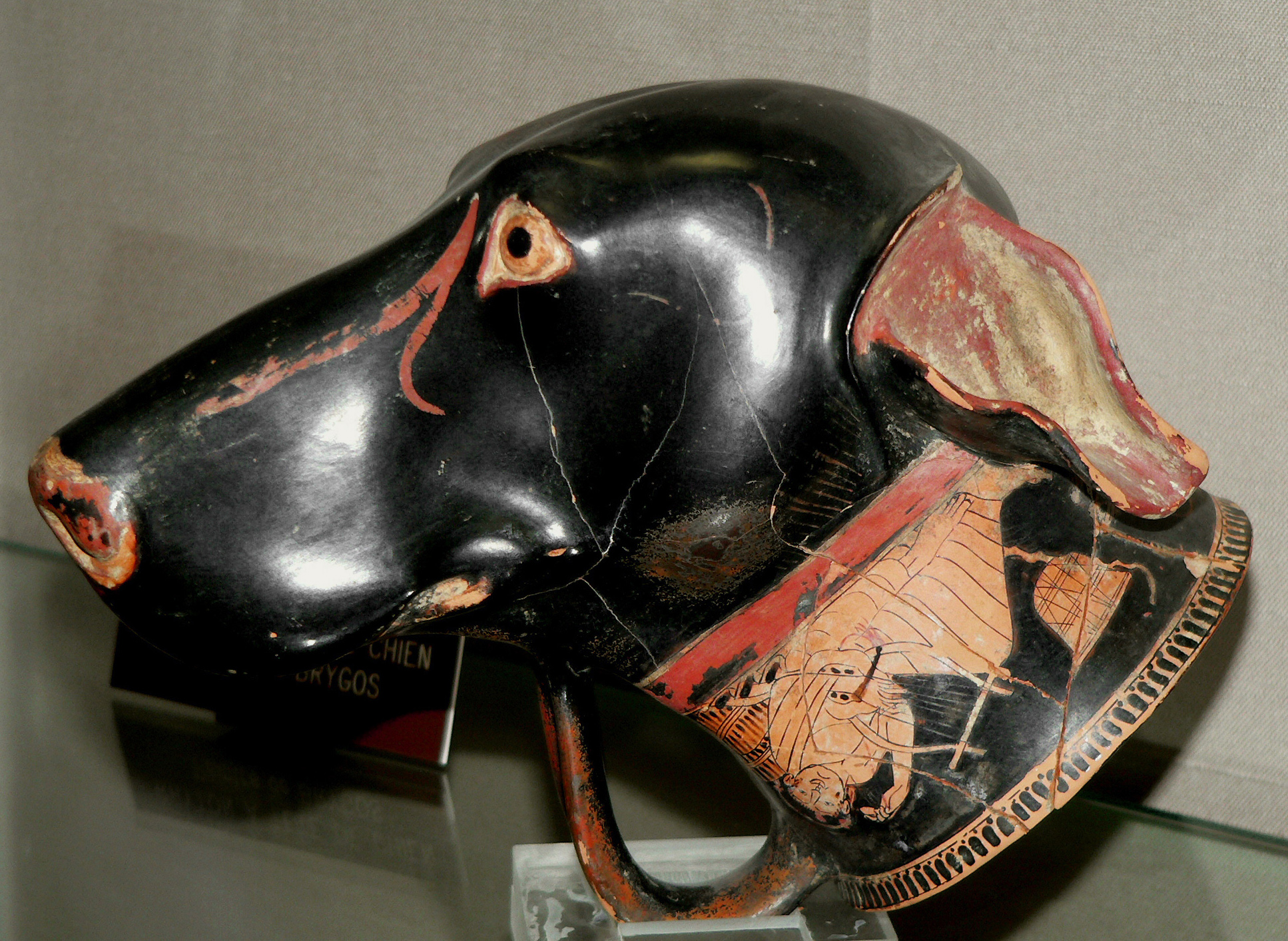
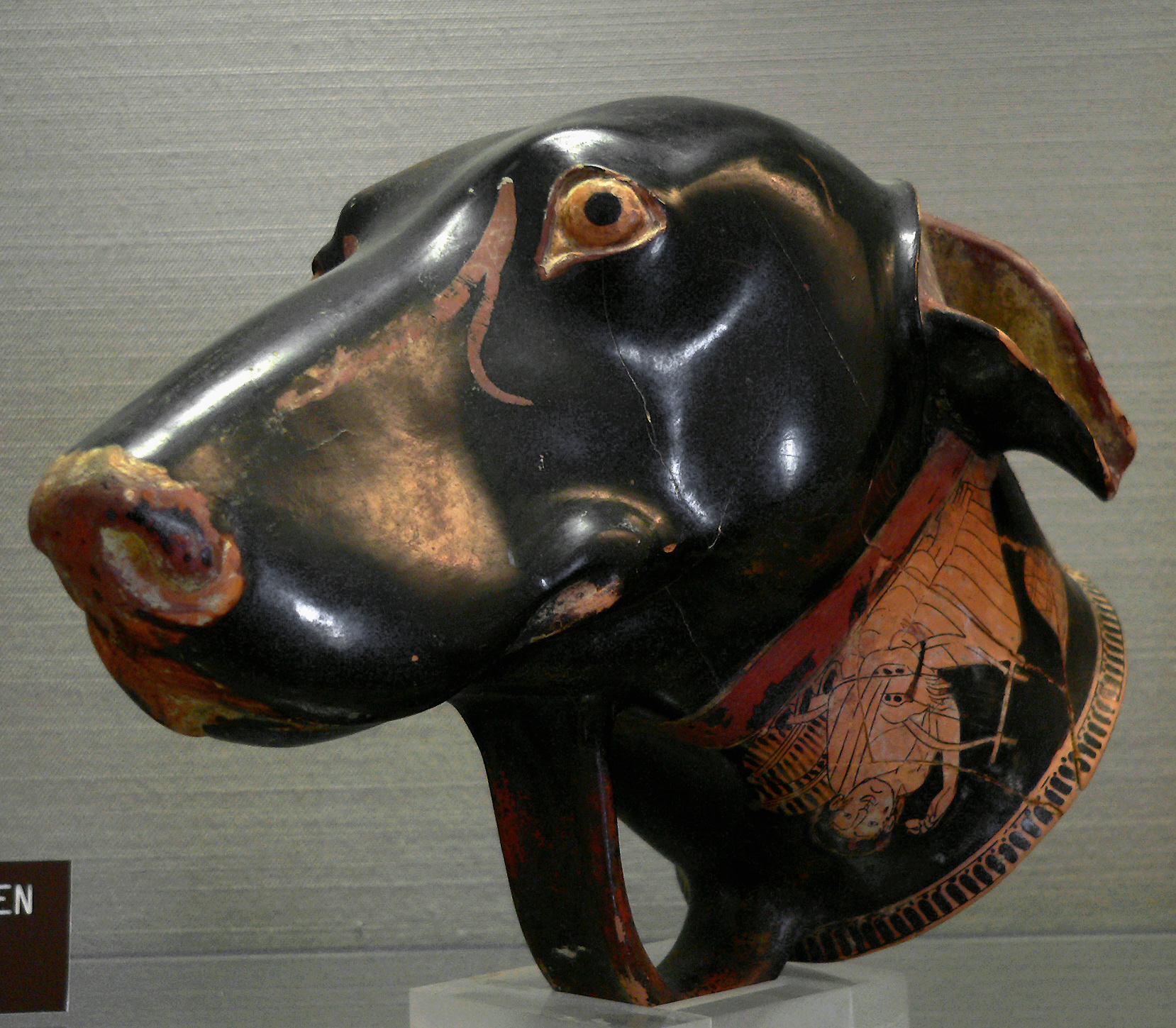
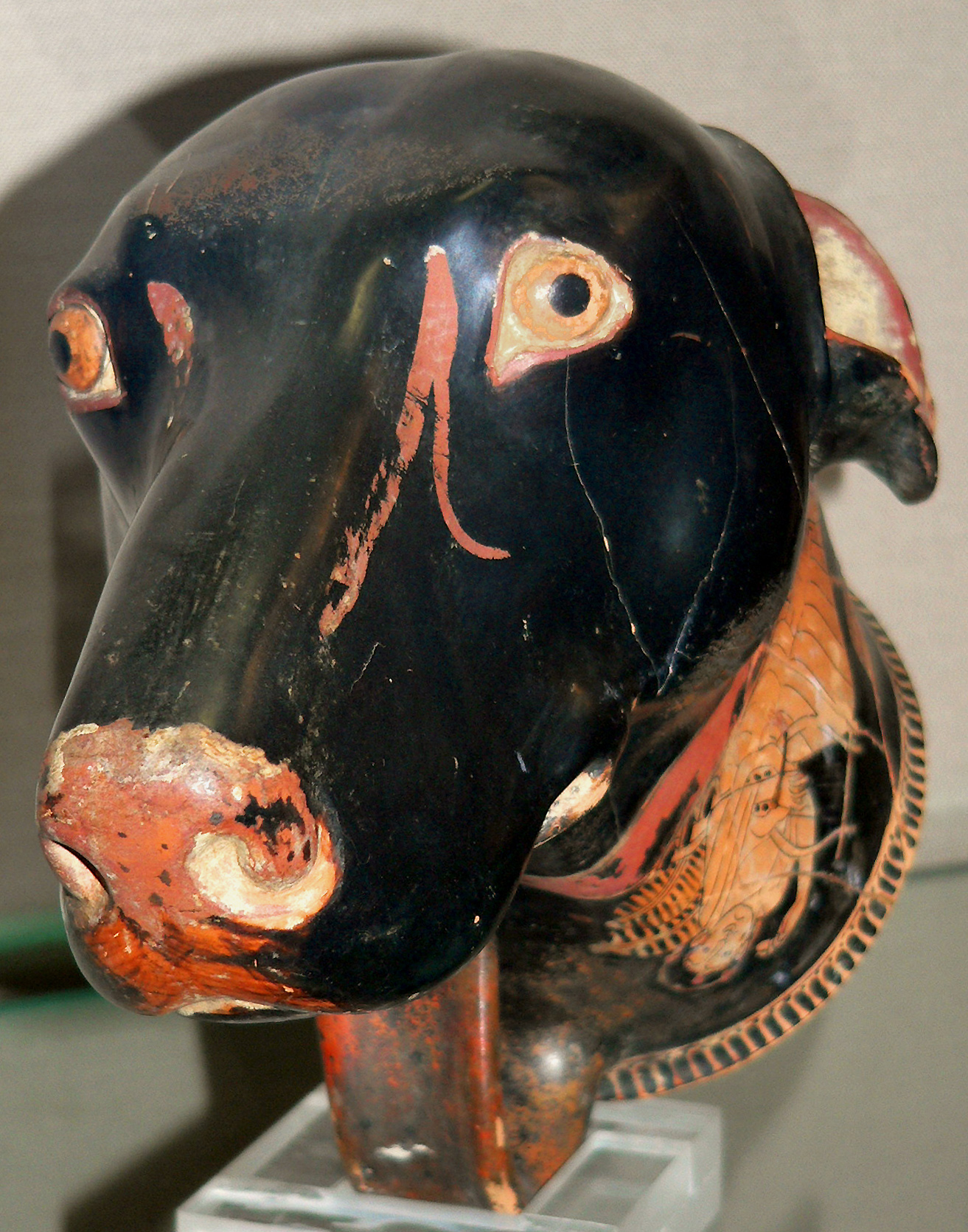
Three views of a rhyton in the shape of a dog's head made by Brygos, early 5th century BC; both the mule and the dog rhytons pictured here are from the Jérôme Carcopino Museum, Department of Archaeology, Aleria

== See also ==
- Pottery of ancient Greece
- Ancient Greek art
- Brygos Painter
- Red-figure pottery
- Kylix

== Bibliography ==
- Beazley, J.D. (1963). Attic Red-Figure Vase-Painters (2nd ed.). Oxford: Clarendon Press. OCLC 294781.
- Beazley, J. D. (1945-04-01). "The Brygos Tomb at Capua". American Journal of Archaeology. 49 (2): 153–158. doi:10.2307/499700. ISSN 0002-9114. JSTOR 499700.
- Cohen, Beth, ed. (2006). The Colors of Clay: Special Techniques in Athenian Pottery. Los Angeles: J. Paul Getty Museum. ISBN 978-0-89236-571-5. OCLC 64336113.
- Kurtz, Donna C.; Boardman, John (1971). Greek Burial Customs. London: Thames Hudson. ISBN 9780801406430. OCLC 1030562359.
- Tonks, Oliver Samuel (1904). "Brygos. His Characteristics". Memoirs of the American Academy of Arts and Sciences. 13 (2). American Academy of Arts & Sciences: 65–117. Bibcode:1904MAAAS..13...65T. doi:10.2307/25058081. ISSN 0096-6134. JSTOR 25058081.
- Williams, Dyfri (1992-10-01). "The Brygos Tomb Reassembled and 19th-Century Commerce in Capuan Antiquities". American Journal of Archaeology. 96 (4): 617–636. doi:10.2307/505188. ISSN 0002-9114. JSTOR 505188.
