= Foundry Painter =

Ancient Greek vase painter

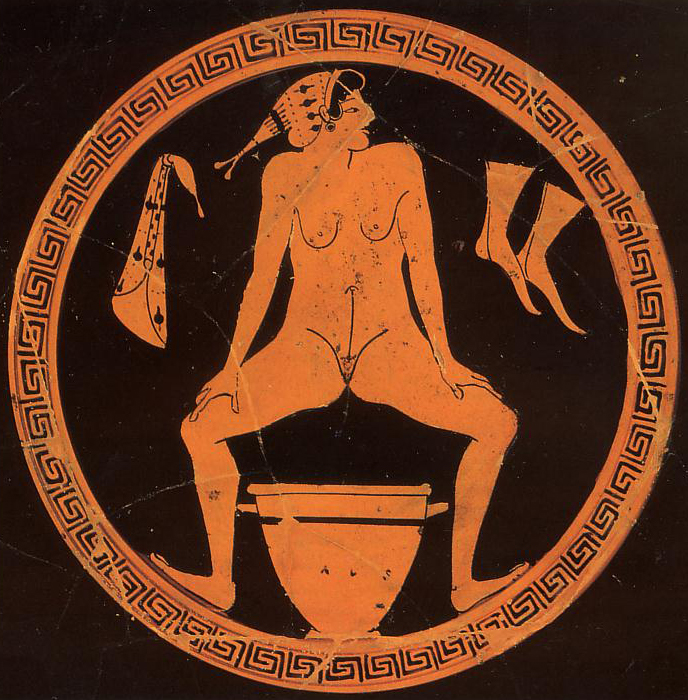
Hetaira urinating into a vessel, tondo of a kylix "in the style of the Foundry Painter", ca. 480 BC. Berlin, Antikensammlung.

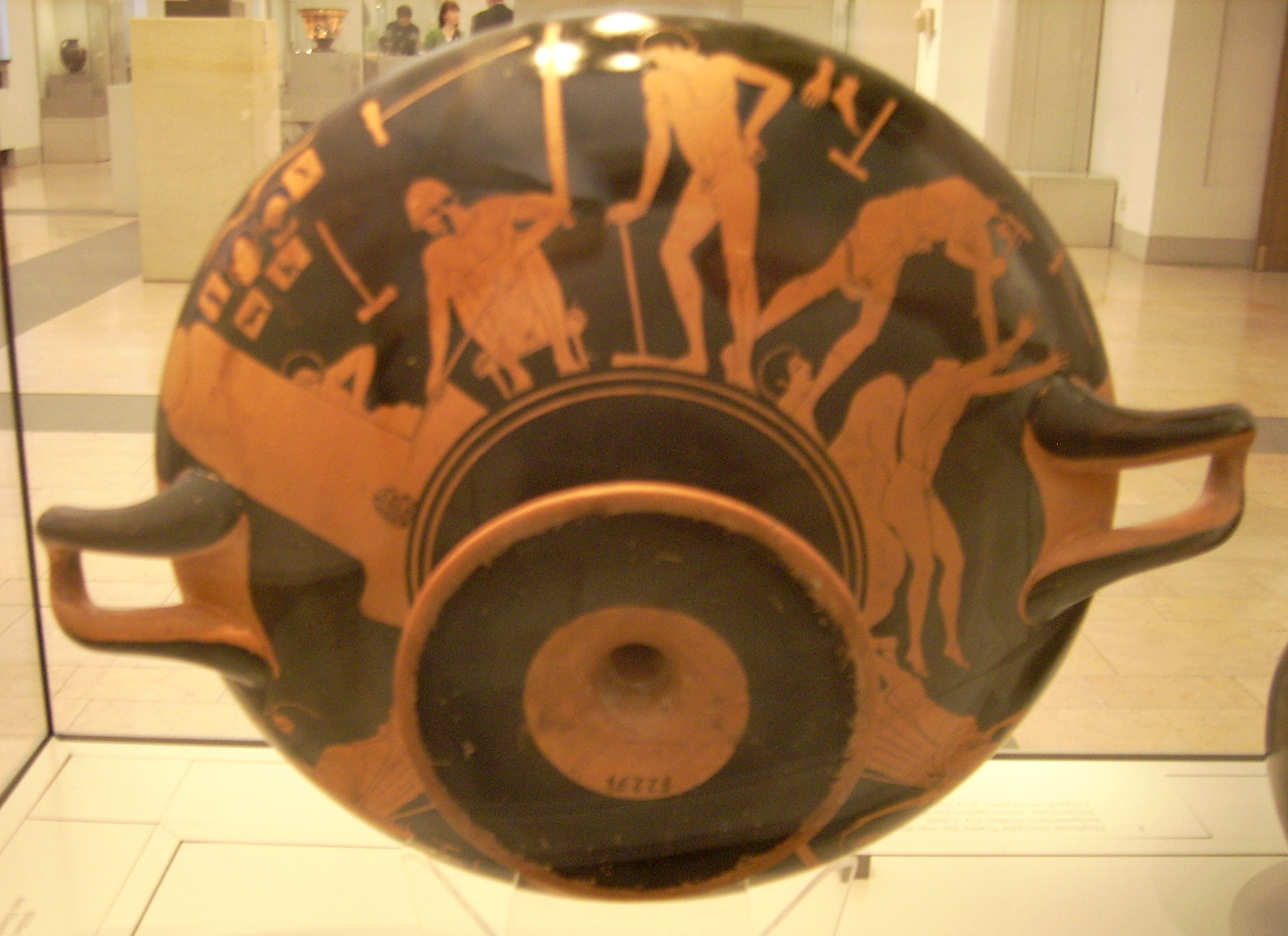
His name vase - the Berlin Foundry Cup.

The Foundry Painter (German: Erzgießerei-Maler) was an ancient Greek Attic red-figure vase painter of the Late Archaic period. His real name is unknown; the conventional name is derived from his most famous work, the Berlin Foundry Cup.

Together with a number of other notable vase painters, such as the Briseis Painter or the Dokimasia Painter, the Foundry Painter was active in the workshop of one of the most important Late Archaic red-figure vase painters, the Brygos Painter. He was less productive than his master, but artistically nearly as talented. His style and subject range are very similar to those of the Brygos Painter, who seems to have had a strong influence on all his collaborators in those regards. Nonetheless, the Foundry Painter's style differs in certain details; John Beazley judged his works as powerful, sometimes even crude.

In contrast to his contemporaries, his figures seem heavier, their faces more schematic. His figures are well-observed, and sometimes depicted not without humour. Such figures as foolish lovers, rotund hetairai and confounded revellers occur. He also attempted to depict body hair and to stress musculature. Additionally, he was one of the very few Late Archaic vase painters to experiment with shading.

Especially his symposium scenes are closely connected with those of the Brygos Painter, although he adds his own characteristic perspective especially in details. Many of his mythical scenes can be described as original. Nonetheless, he is especially important because of his depictions of everyday life and of craft activity. For example, there is a vase by him that depicts a sculptor at work, watched by the goddess Athena, shown at Olive and Oil Museum in Torgiano.

His most famous work is his name vase, kylix in the Antikensammlung at Berlin, the so-called Berlin Foundry Cup. Its exterior depicts a bronze workshop; it is among the very few sources on ancient metal production. The Foundry Painter was active in the first third of the 5th century BC. He mainly painted drinking cups. Some of his works are in the white-ground technique.

== Gallery ==
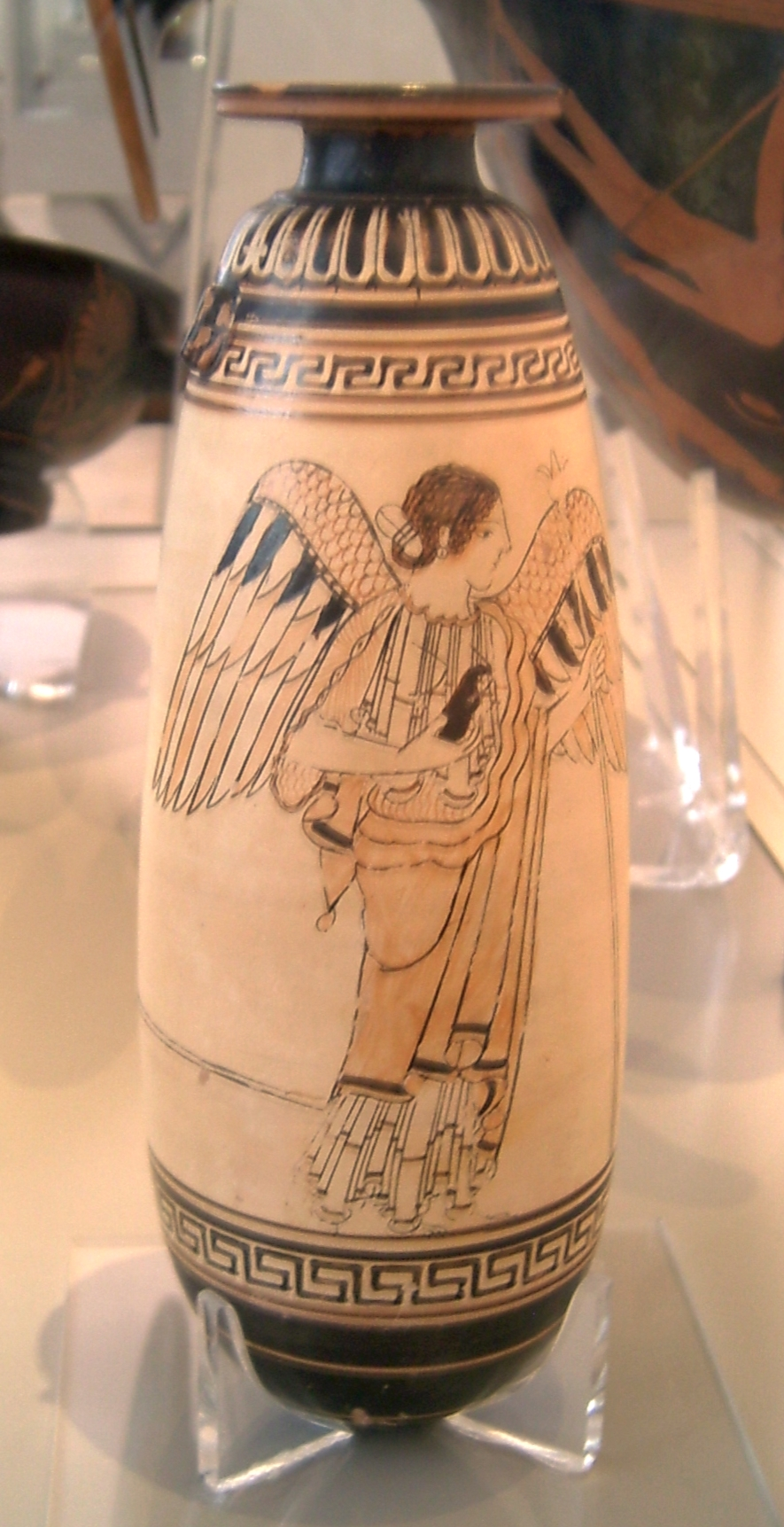
Nike and an athlete on a white-ground alabastron, from the school of the Foundry Painter, ca. 480 BC, found at Tanagra. Berlin, Antikensammlung.

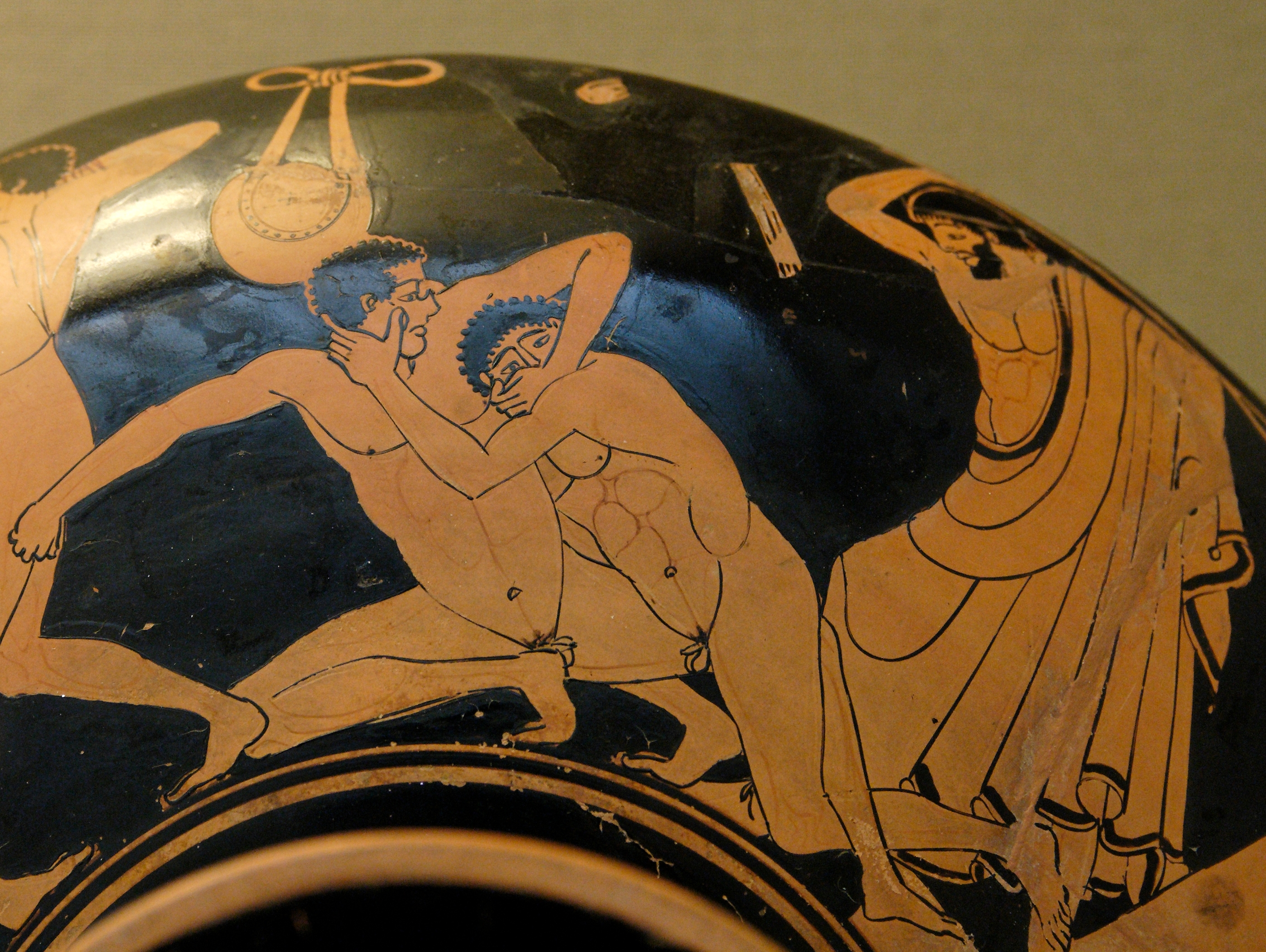
Pankration wrestlers on a kylix, ca. 480 BC. London, British Museum.

== Bibliography ==
- John D. Beazley. Attic Red-Figure Vase-Painters. Oxford: Clarendon Press, 1963.
- John Boardman. Rotfigurige Vasen aus Athen. Die archaische Zeit, Philipp von Zabern, 4th edition, Mainz, 1994 (Kulturgeschichte der Antiken Welt, Vol 4), esp. p. 151, ISBN 3-8053-0234-7
