= Marcon (surname) =

Marcon (or Marcón) is the surname of:

== Film and television ==
- André Marcon (born 1948), French actor
- Kirstin Marcon (fl. since 2000), New Zealand screenwriter and film director

== Sport ==
- Adam Marcon (born 1992), Australian rules footballer
- Eliomar Marcón (born 1975), Brazilian footballer, mostly for Mexican clubs
- Francesca Marcon (born 1983), Italian volleyball player
- Lou Marcon (1935–2023), Canadian ice hockey player
- Paul Marcon (born 1995), French rugby league player
- Sergio Marcon (born 1970), Italian football goalkeeper for various Italian clubs
- Sholto Marcon (1890–1959), English field hockey player, gold medallist at the 1920 Olympics
- Walter Marcon (1824–1875), English cricketer

== Other ==
- Régis Marcon (born 1956), French chef and restaurateur
- Charles Abdy Marcon (1853–1953), English clergyman, Master of Marcon's Hall of Oxford University
- Andrea Marcon (born 1963), Italian conductor, organist and harpsichordist

== See also ==
- Macron § People for people surnamed Macron
  - Emmanuel Macron, President of France
