= Macron =

Macron may refer to:

== People ==
- Emmanuel Macron (born 1977), president of France since 2017
- Brigitte Macron (born 1953), French teacher, wife of Emmanuel Macron
- Jean-Michel Macron (born 1950), French professor of neurology, father of Emmanuel Macron
- Ptolemy Macron (fl. 2nd century BCE), Seleucid general and governor

== Science ==
- Macron (gastropod), a genus of sea snails
- Macron (physics), high-energy particle

== Typography ==
- Macron (diacritic), a straight bar placed over a letter
- Macron below, a macron placed below a letter
- Overline, a horizontal line over two or more letters, sometimes mistakenly called a macron

== Other ==
- Macron (sportswear), an Italian sportswear manufacturer
- Macron Stadium, a former name of University of Bolton Stadium, home to Bolton Wanderers F.C. in Horwich, Lancashire, England
- Macron 1, the name of the North American version of GoShogun, a Japanese anime series

== See also ==
- Underscore (disambiguation)
- Macro (disambiguation)
- Makron (disambiguation)
- Marcon (disambiguation)
- Micron (disambiguation)
- Macaron, a type of meringue-based sweet confection
- Macaroon, a type of cake
