= Underscore (disambiguation) =

The underscore _ is a typographic element.

Underscore, underline or _ may also refer to:

- Macron below, a diacritic accent
- Underscore (dance), a practice in contact improvisation developed by Nancy Stark Smith
- Underscore.js, a JavaScript library providing utility functions for common programming tasks
- Underscoring, a technique in musical theatre
- _ (album), a 2016 album by BT
- Underscores (musician), an American musical artist

== See also ==
- Macron (disambiguation)
- Strikethrough
- Bar (diacritic)
- Overline or overscore or overbar
