= Micron (disambiguation) =

A micron is a non-SI name for micrometre (μm).

Micron may also refer to:

== Science ==
- Micrometre of mercury, a unit of pressure equal to one thousandth of a millimeter of mercury.
- Micron (wool), the measurement used to express the diameter of a wool fibre
- Micron (journal), a scientific microscopy journal
- Micron (magazine), an Italian science and technology magazine

== Technology ==
- Alesis Micron, an analog-modelling synthesizer made by Alesis Studio Electronics
- Micron Technology, an American semiconductor manufacturing company

== Other uses ==
- Marten Micron (1523–1559), Dutch pastor and theologian
- Micron, a unit used to measure time or distance in Battlestar Galactica
- Micron (character), a character from DC Comics
- Wright Micron, a human-powered aircraft built by Peter Wright
- Micron pens, a colloquially used term for the Sakura Pigma Micron Pen line distributed by Sakura Color Products Corporation.
