= MarsCon =

MarsCon is the name of two separate, unaffiliated science fiction conventions:

- MarsCon (Williamsburg, Virginia)
- MarsCon (Bloomington, Minnesota)
