= Dokimasia Painter =

Ancient Greek vase painter

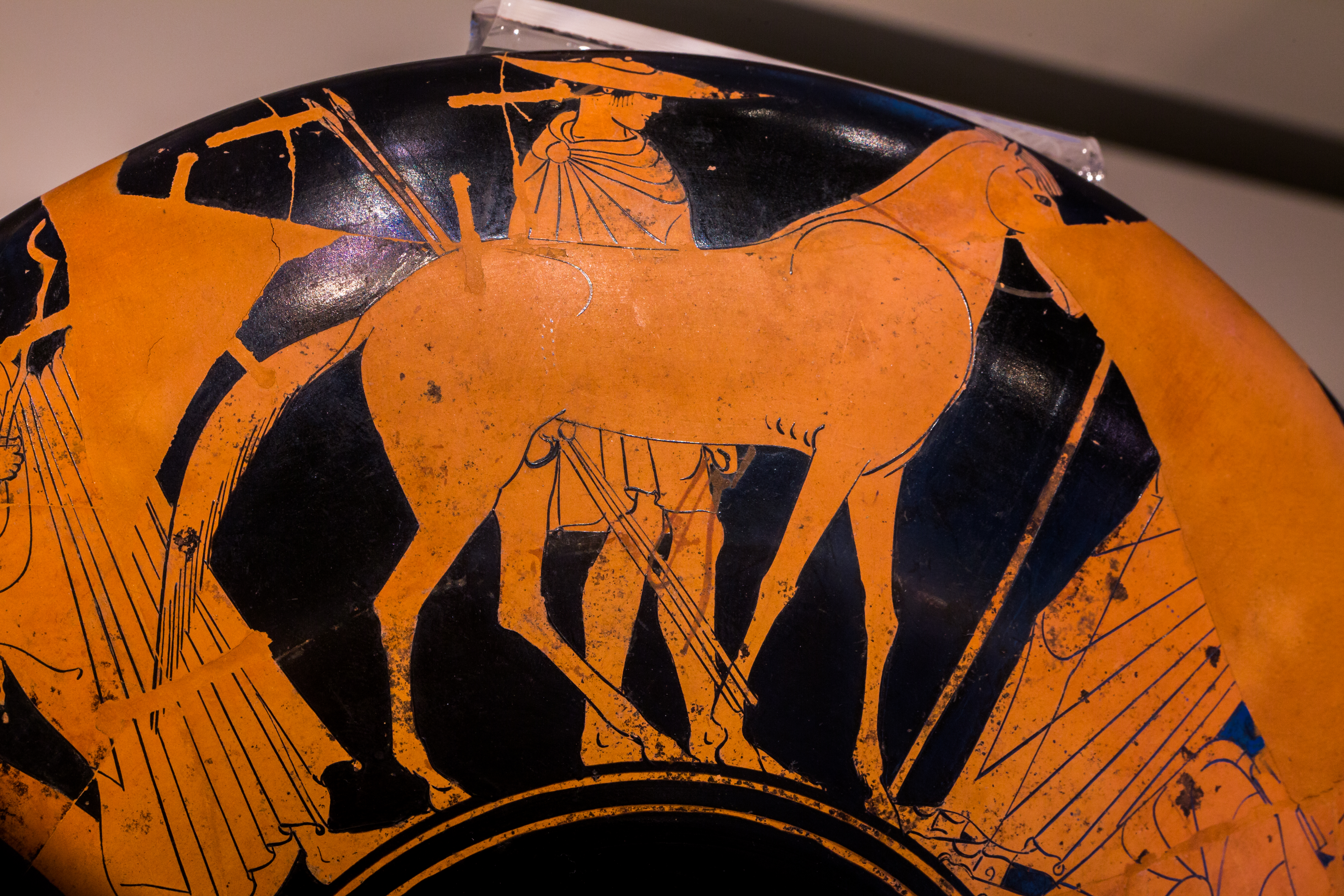
A kylix decorated by the Dokimasia Painter, held at the Altes Museum in Berlin.

The Dokimasia Painter (active between 480 and 460 BC at Athens) was a Greek vase-painter of the Attic red-figure style. His actual name is unknown and his conventional name is derived from his name-vase, showing the inspection of horses at the Dokimasia festival, now in Berlin.
