= Micron (journal) =

- Discipline: Microscopy
- Language: English
- Edited by: G. Cox, F. Braet

Publication details
- History: 1969-present
- Publisher: Elsevier
- Frequency: Monthly
- Impact factor: 2.7 (2025)

Standard abbreviations
- ISO 4: Micron

Indexing
- CODEN: MCONEN
- ISSN: 0968-4328
- LCCN: 94660585
- OCLC no.: 301151203

Links
- Journal homepage; Online access

Micron is a monthly peer-reviewed scientific journal in the field of microscopy. It was established in 1969 and is published by Elsevier.
