= Makron (vase painter) =

Ancient Greek vase painter

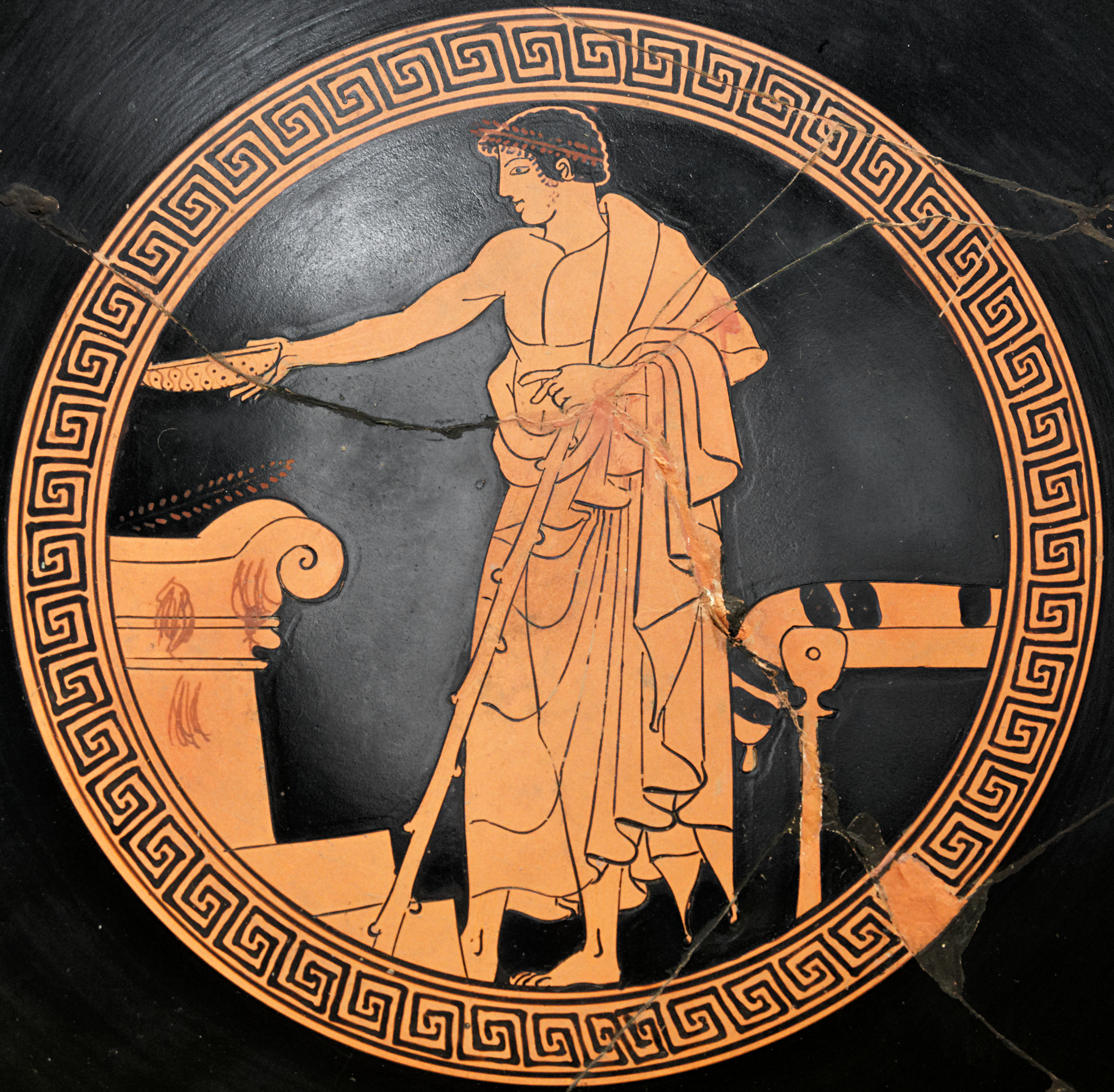
Libation scene. Interior of an Attic red-figure cup, ca. 480 BC. Found in Vulci. Paravey Collection, 1879 (G 149).

Makron was an ancient Greek vase painter active in Athens ca. 490–480 BC. Though only one signed example of his work is known to have survived, some 350 vases have been attributed to him by Sir John Beazley, making him one of the best surviving painters of the red-figure period.

"He specialized in the decoration of cups, but occasionally worked with other types of vessels. Most of his vases depict scenes from daily life: revelry, athletics, or erotica."

Unlike many other vase painters of this period, Makron does not seem to have worked with a variety of potters, moving from workshop to workshop. Instead, he appears to have had a steady collaboration with the potter Hieron. Strongly associated with Hieron, Beazley attributes all but three vases signed by Hieron as potter to Makron as painter, whereas earlier scholarship did not associate the two. Adolf Furtwängler was the first to do so.

== Sources ==
- The Getty Museum - Biography of Makron
