= Siana cup =

Type of ancient Attic cup

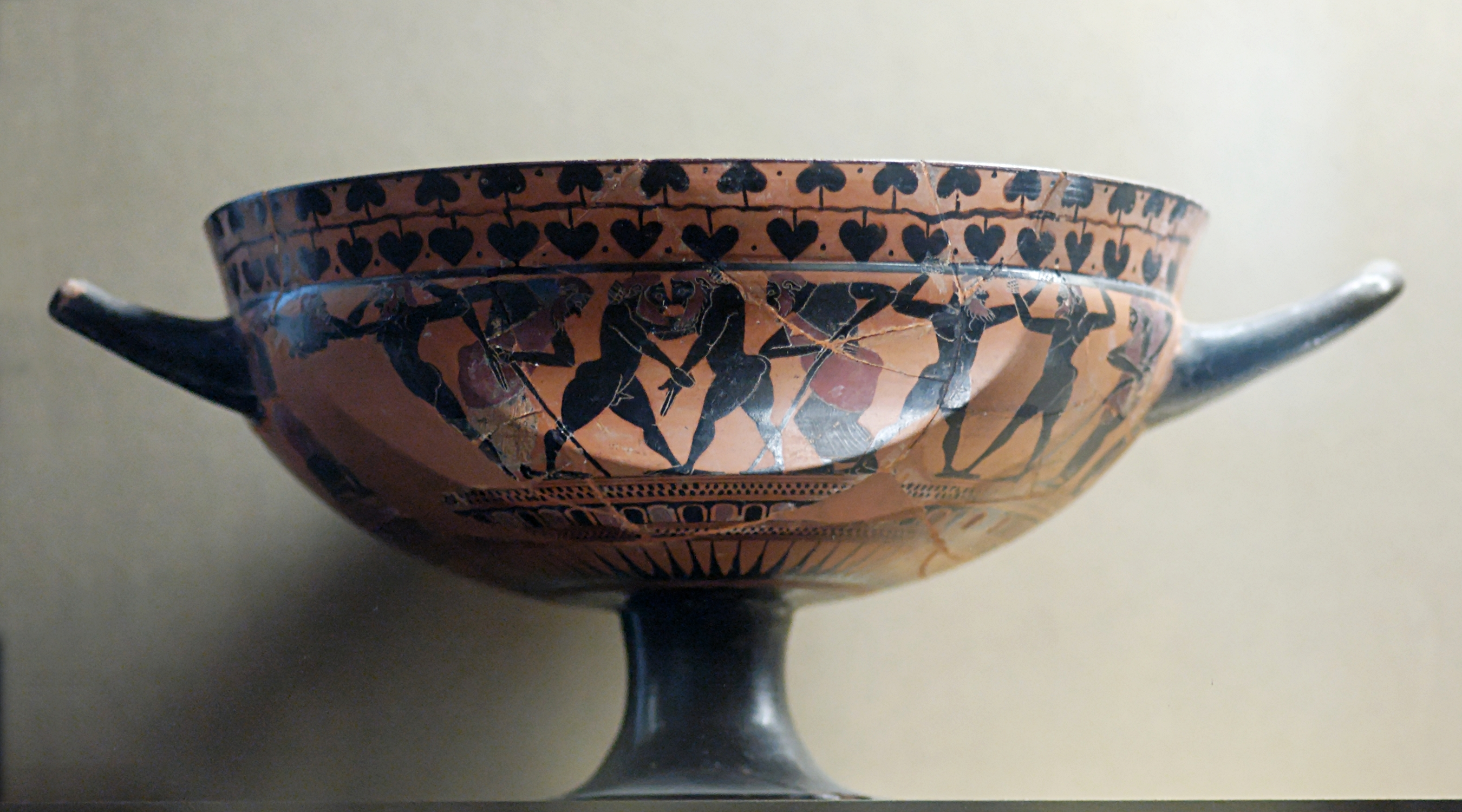
Double-decker Siana cup, Louvre, Paris, F 67

A Siana cup is a type of Attic cup decorated in the black-figure technique. They are named after one of their find locations, the Necropolis of the ancient city of Siana on Rhodes. During the second quarter of the 6th century BC, Siana cups were the predominant cup shape in Athens. The shape remained popular later and was still being produced in large quantities during the era of the Little-Master cups.

Siana cups were the successors of Komast cups, produced by the Komast Group. In fact, the last representatives of that group were the first to manufacture Siana cups. Typical features include the clearly distinguished lip or rim, and the concave foot, which is taller than in Komast cups. The handles are slightly upturned. A new development is the use of painted tondos on the cup interior. These were often framed by bands of flames or other ornamentation; the central image was frequently of a running human figure in a semi-crouched position.

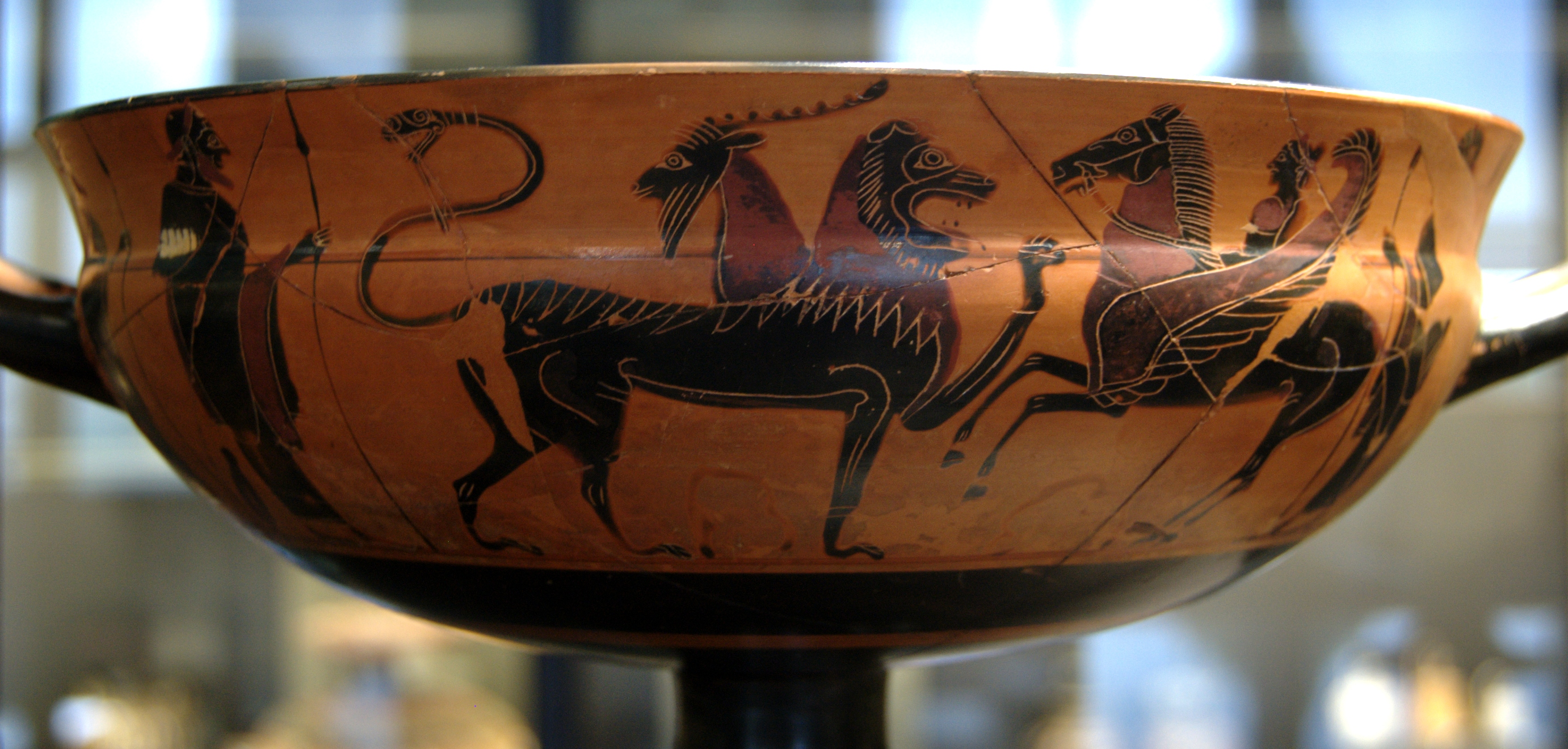
Siana cup painted according to the "overlap" scheme by the Heidelberg Painter, Bellerophon fighting the Chimaira, Attic, c. 575/550 BC

There are two separate decorative schemes for the exteriors. Some of the images are painted straight across the carination (or fold) between the bowl and the rim. This is known as the "overlap" scheme. In other cases, the parts above and below the carination are painted separately and described as "double-deckers". In that scheme, the upper frieze is often purely ornamental, especially with vegetal patterns of ivy or laurel. This type is especially common in East Greece. Animal friezes are comparably rarer. Figural decorations occur in the handle zone, as do handle palmettes. Popular pictorial themes include symposia, komasts, cavalcades, duels, as well as athletic and mythological scenes.

Several vase painters had specialised in painting Siana cups. The most important among them was the C Painter. Others include the Painter of Athens 553, the Heidelberg Painter, the Painter of Boston CA, the Kassandra Painter, the Sandal Painter, the Civico Painter and the Griffin-Bird Painter. At present, about 1,000 cups and fragments are known; a classification vital for their chronology and stylistic categorisation has been developed by Herman Brijder. A special type is so-called Merrythought cups, with a forked handle.

== Bibliography ==
- John Beazley: Attic Black-Figure Vase-Painters, Oxford 1956, S.
- John Beazley: Paralipomena. Additions to Attic black-figure vase-painters and to Attic red-figure vase-painters, Oxford 1971, S. 23–29.
- John Boardman: Schwarzfigurige Vasen aus Athen. Ein Handbuch, von Zabern, Mainz 1977 (Kulturgeschichte der Antiken Welt, Band 1). ISBN 3-8053-0233-9. S. 34–37.
- Herman A. G. Brijder: Siana cups I and Komast cups (2 vols.), Allard Pierson Museum, Amsterdam 1983 (Allard Pierson Series vol. 4). ISBN 90-71211-06-1.
- Herman A. G. Brijder: Siana cups II: the Heidelberg painter (2 vols.), Allard Pierson Museum, Amsterdam 1991 (Allard Pierson series. Studies in ancient civilization, Bd. 8). ISBN 90-71211-20-7.
- Herman A. G. Brijder: Siana cups III. The Red-Black Painter, Griffin-Bird Painter and Siana cups resembling lip-cups (2 Teilbände: Text- und Tafelband), Allard Pierson Museum, Amsterdam 2000 (Allard Pierson series. Studies in ancient civilization, Bd. 13). ISBN 90-71211-34-7.
