= Boeotian vase painting =

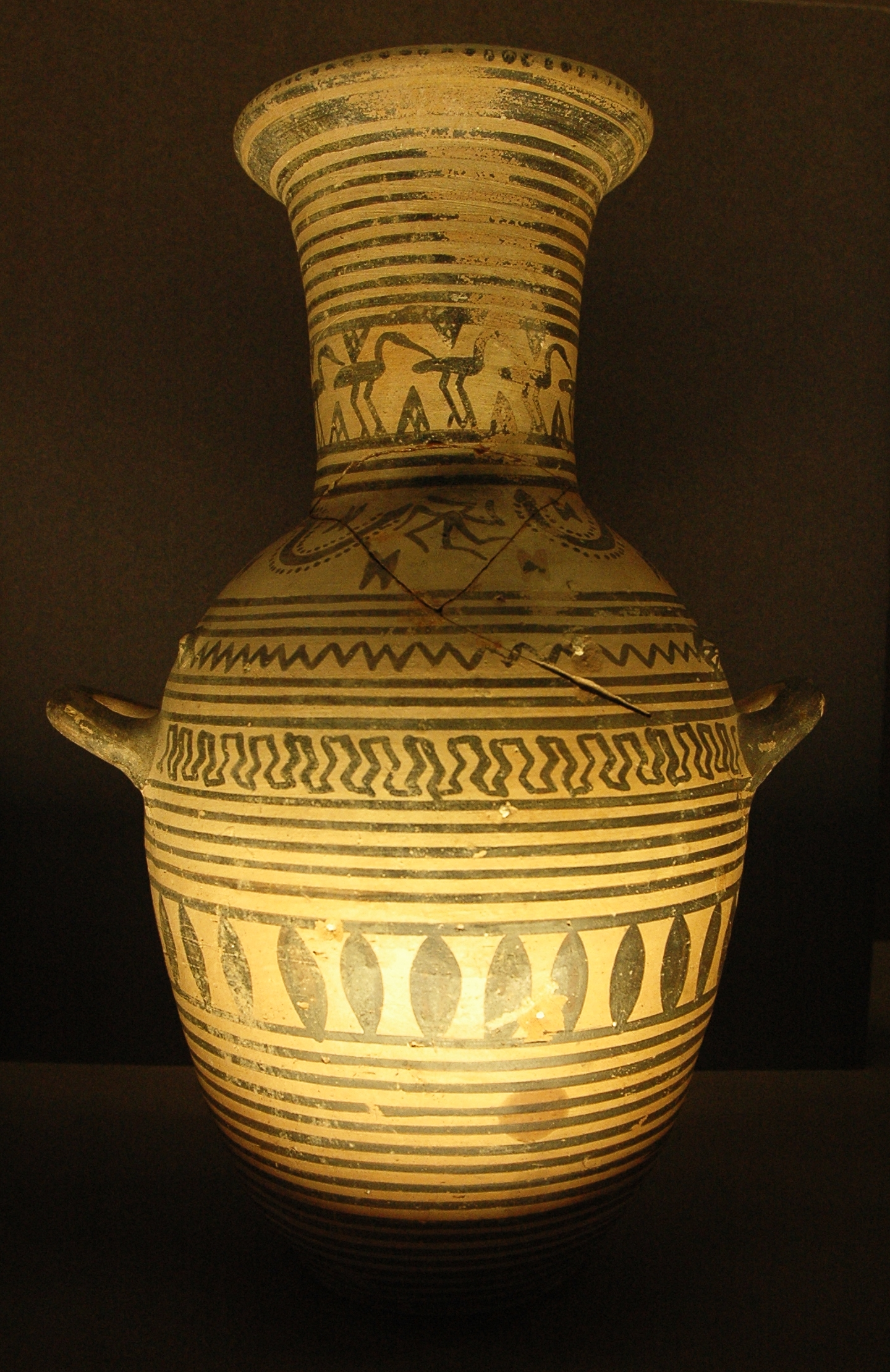
Late Geometric hydria, circa 700/675 BC. Paris: Louvre.

Boeotian vase painting was a regional style of ancient Greek vase painting. Since the Geometric period, and up to the 4th century BC, the region of Boeotia produced vases with ornamental and figural painted decoration, usually of lesser quality than the vase paintings from other areas.

The Geometric vase painting of Boeotia was rather lifeless and distinctly provincial, especially in comparison to the advanced produce of Attica. Often, it simply imitated Attic pottery. The Geometric style was followed for an extended period by the so-called Subgeometric, before orientalising vase painting became dominant. During the orientalising period, floral and other ornamentation was especially popular. There was also some experimentation with added colours, mainly red and white, and also, to some extent, with figural motifs (animals and humans). Influences came mostly from Attica and East Greece, than from the true centre of orientalising pottery, Corinth.

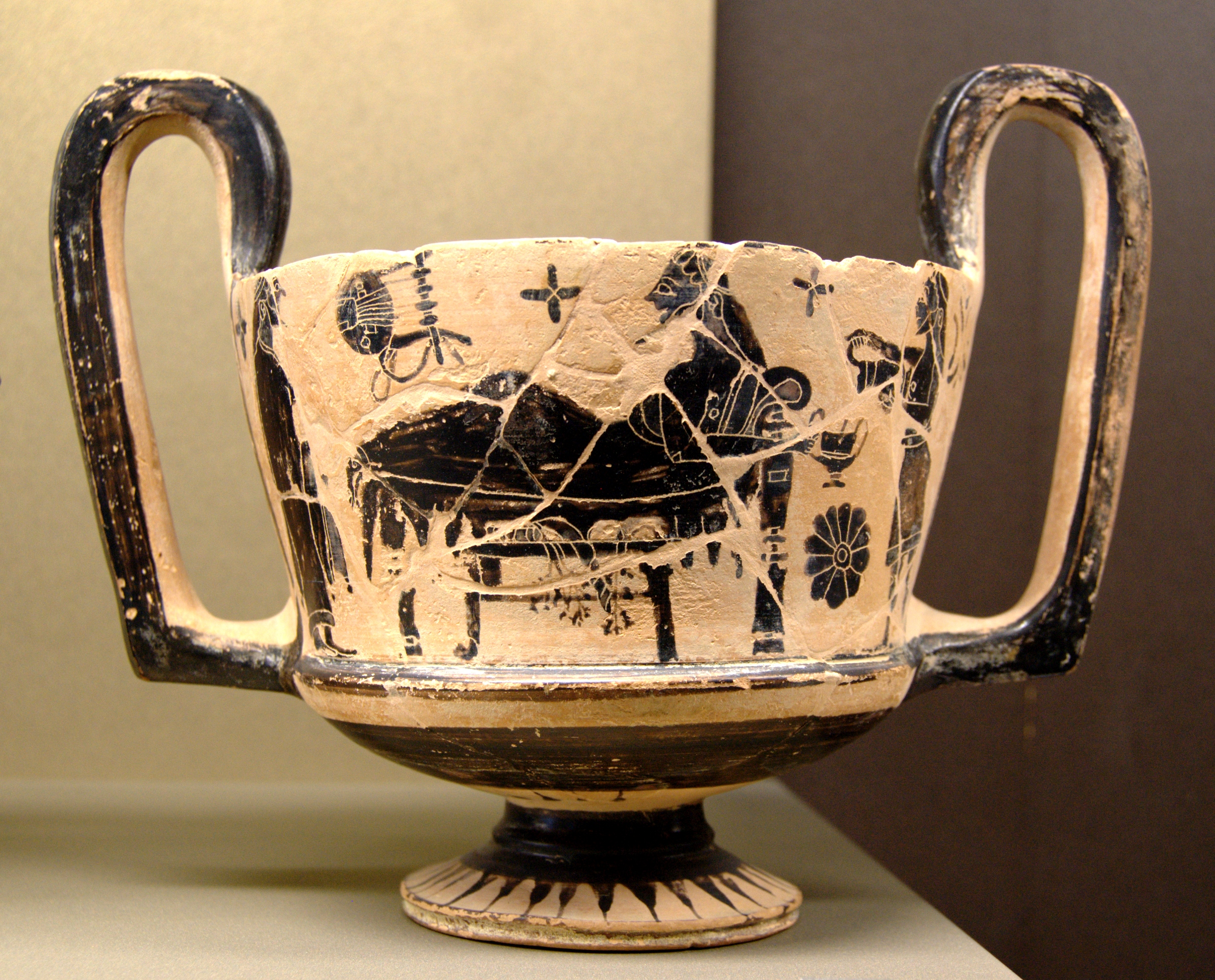
Symposion scene on a kantharos by the Boeotian Dancer Group, circa 560 BC. Louvre.

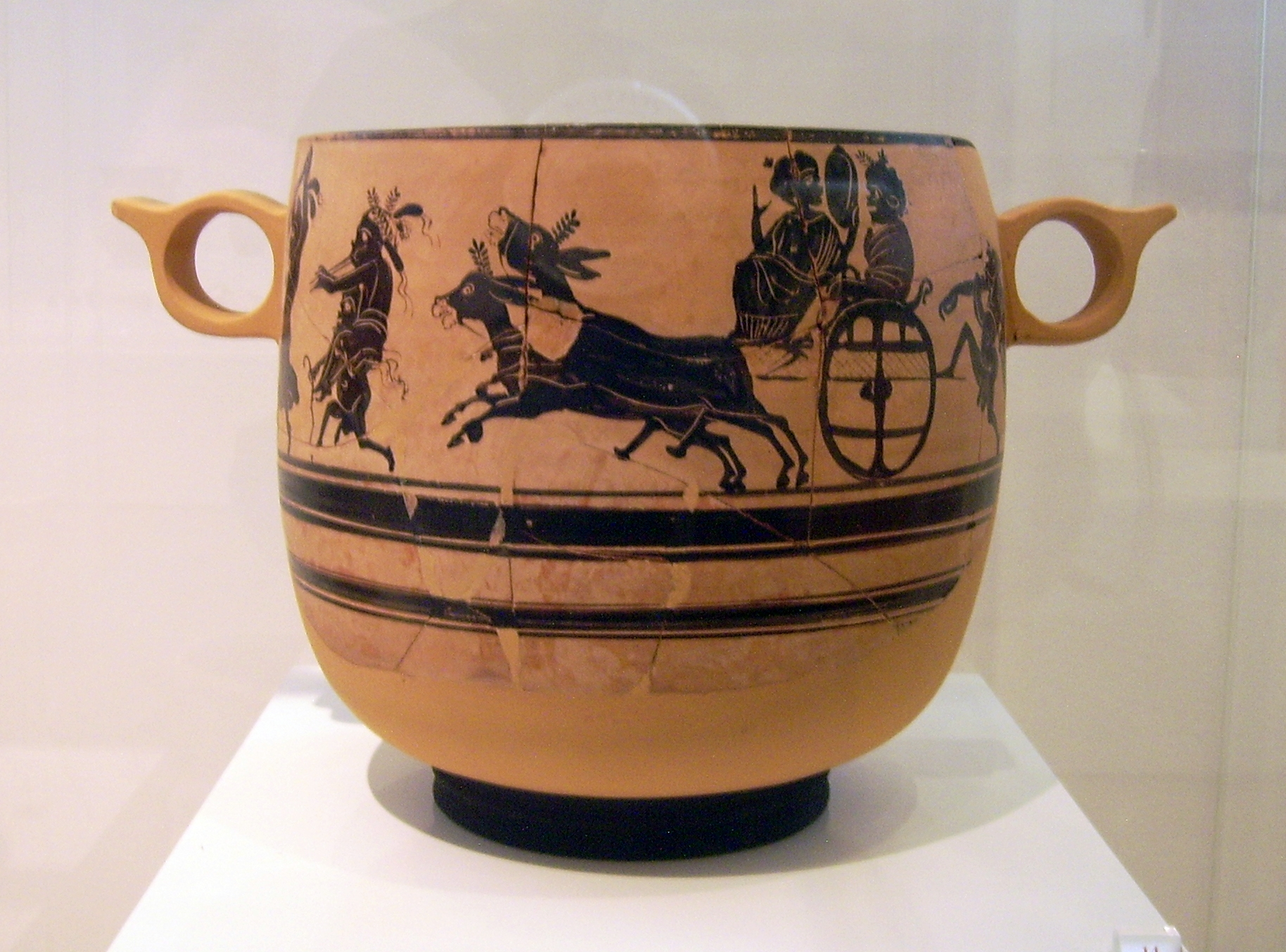
Kabirian skyphos. Procession towards the sanctuary of the Kabiria. Mystai Painter. Late 5th/early 4th century BC.

From the 6th to the 4th century BC, Boeotia produced black-figure vases. In the early 6th century, many Boeotian painters still used the orientalising silhouette technique. Thereafter, the followed Attic production particularly closely. At times, distinction between or ascription to the two areas is difficult, some material can also be confused with Corinthian vases. Often, Attic vases of low quality are mistaken as Boeotian. There was probably some level of exchange of personnel with Attica; in at least one case, Bird-Horse Painter, an Attic artist emigrated to Boeotia, the same also probably applies to the Tokra Painter and certainly to the potter Teisias the Athenian. Important motifs included animal friezes, symposia and komasts. Mythological imagery is quite rare; when it occurs, it usually shows Herakles or Theseus. In the late 6th and early 5th centuries, a silhouette style prevailed. Painted shapes were predominantly kantharoi, lekanai, kylikes, plates and jugs. Between 420 and 350 BC, the Kabiria Group were the dominant black-figure style in Boeotia. As in Athens, kalos inscriptions occurred. Boeotian potters had a predilection to produce plastic vessels, also kantharoi with plastic applications and tripod-pyxides. Lekanis, kylix and neck amphora were adopted from Athens. The paintings style often appears comical; komasts and satyrs were preferred motifs.

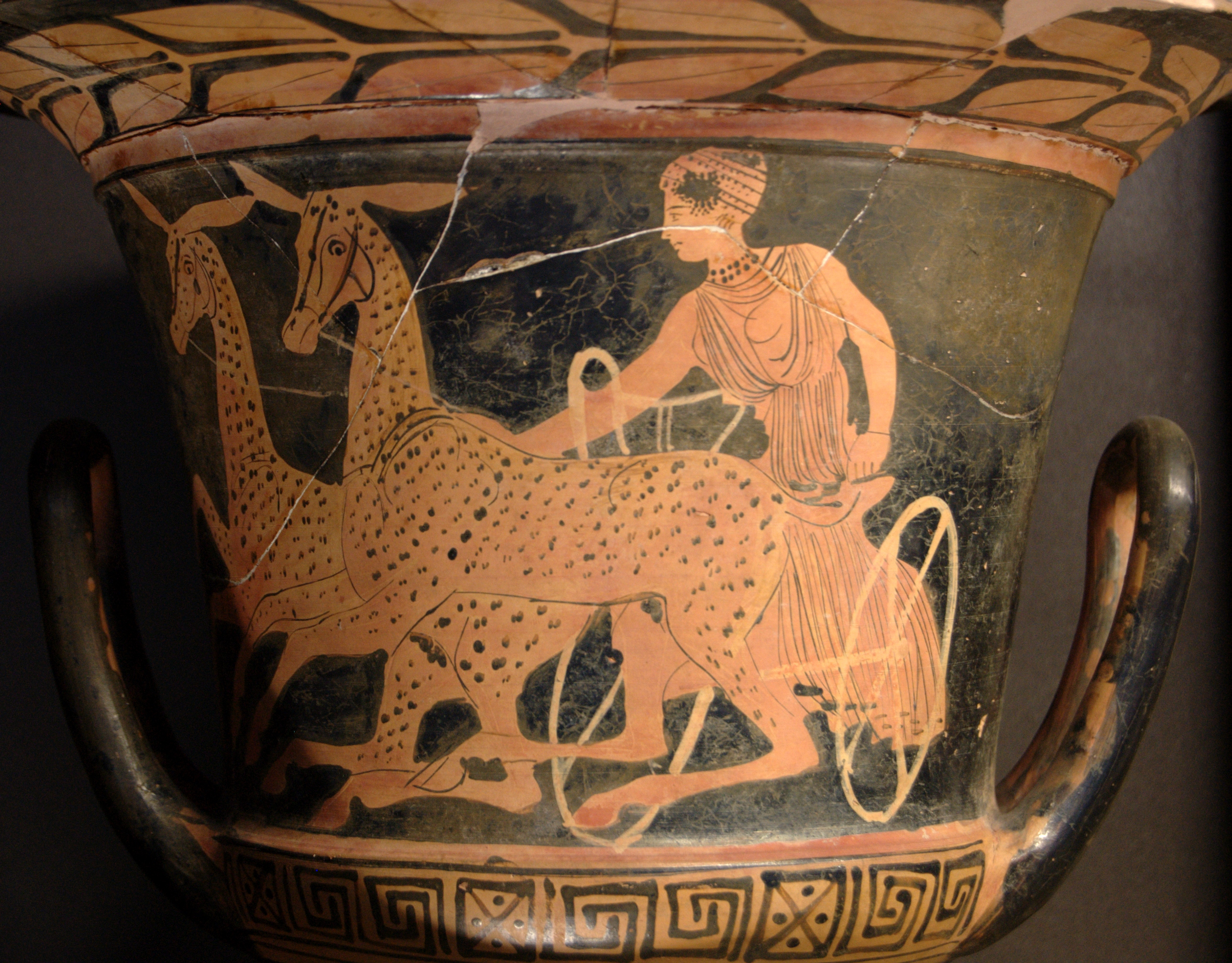
Artemis in a chariotin, on a kantharos by the Painter of the Great Athens Kantharos, circa 450/425 BC. Louvre.

Boeotian red-figure vase painting flourished between the second half of the 5th and the first decades of the 4th centuries BC. By applying a red slip, the potters attempted to imitate Attic products. This was necessary, as the clay of Boeotia was lighter in colour, roughly like yellow leather. A brown-black slip was then added. Inscriptions were often incised rather than painted on. The figures lack the three-dimensionality of their Attic models. Further, there is no true development of Boeotian red-figure, it merely attempts to copy Athenian forms of expression. The most important artists were the Painter of the Judgement of Paris (following especially the examples of Polygnotos and the Lykaon Painter), the Painter of the Athens Argos Cup (resembling the Shuvalov Painter and the Marlay Painter), as well as the Painter of the Great Athens Kantharos. The later is stylistically so close to the Attic Dinos Painter that it has been suggested he may have been taught by him.

== Bibliography ==
- Thomas Mannack: Griechische Vasenmalerei. Eine Einführung. Theiss, Stuttgart 2002, p. 128f., 158f. ISBN 3-8062-1743-2.
- Gerald P. Schaus: Geometrische Vasenmalerei, In: Der Neue Pauly Vol. 4 (1998), Col. 935–938
- Johannes Schwind: Orientalisierende Vasenmalerei, In: Der Neue Pauly Vol. 9 (2000), Col. 23–26
- Matthias Steinhart: Schwarzfigurige Vasenmalerei II. Ausserattisch, In: Der Neue Pauly Vol. 11 (2001), Col. 276-281
