= KY Painter =

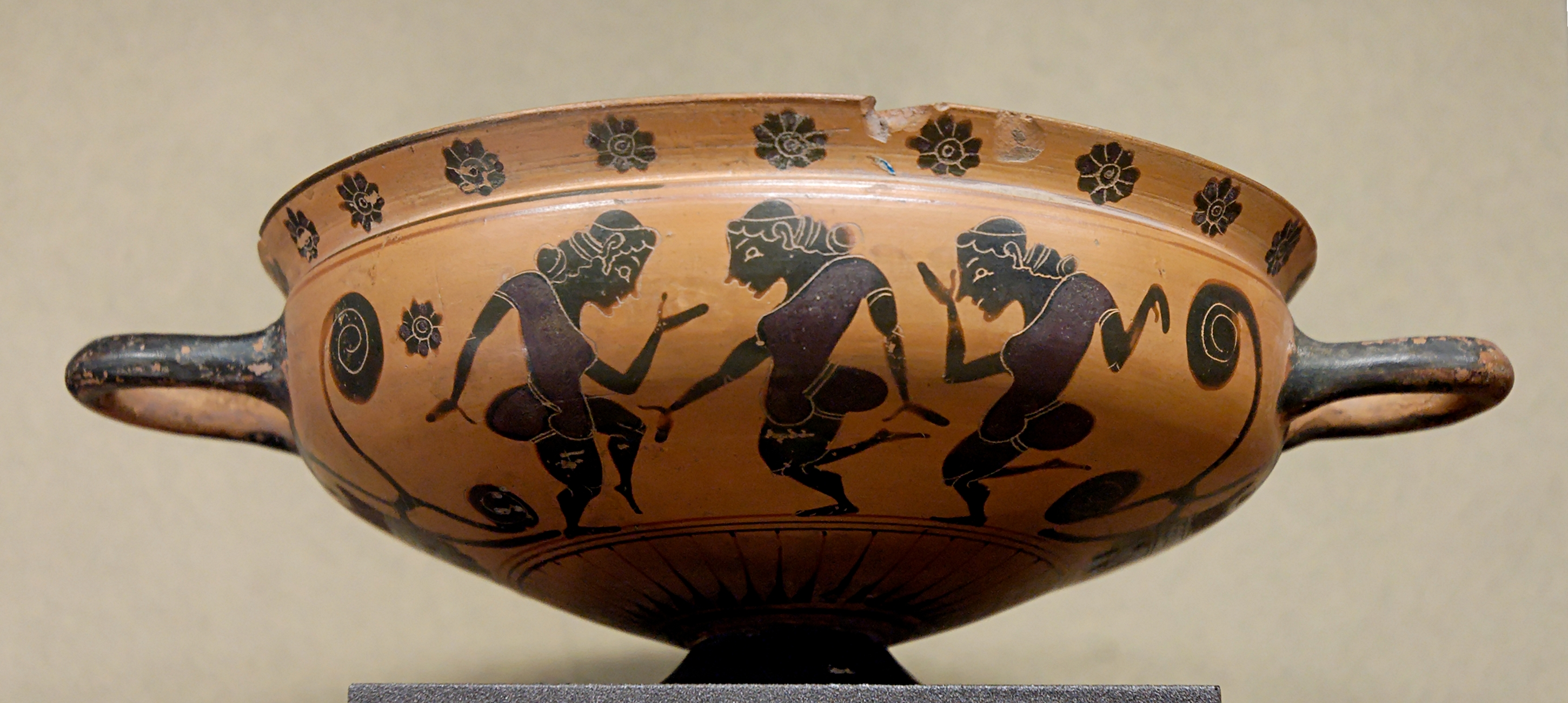
Komast cup with komos scene, 575/565 BC.

The KY Painter was an Attic black-figure vase painter. He was active between 585 and 570 BC.

Besides the KX Painter, the KY Painter was the main representative of the Komast Group, which succeeded the Gorgon Painter. His conventional name was allocated by John Beazley. He is considered the less talented and chronologically somewhat later representative of the group. Komasts are one of his favourite motifs. He mainly painted skyphoi, lekanes, kothones and Komast cups. He was the first artist to paint a column krater, which was to become a popular wine-mixing vessel.

== Bibliography ==
- John D. Beazley: Attic Black-figure Vase-painters. Oxford 1956, p. 31-33
- John Michael Boardman (1977). Schwarzfigurige Vasen aus Athen.: Ein Handbuch. p. 19. ISBN 978-3-8053-0233-3.
