= Boxing Siana Cup =

The Boxing Siana Cup (Mississippi 1977.3.68 vase), is an Archaic vase that is part of the University Museums at the University of Mississippi. The vase is from the region of Attica and is dated to be around 560 BC – 550 BC. The design style of the vase is Attic black-figure and features a scene on the front and back of the cup and one on the interior. The artist of the vase is considered to be the Sandal Painter.

== Vase shape ==
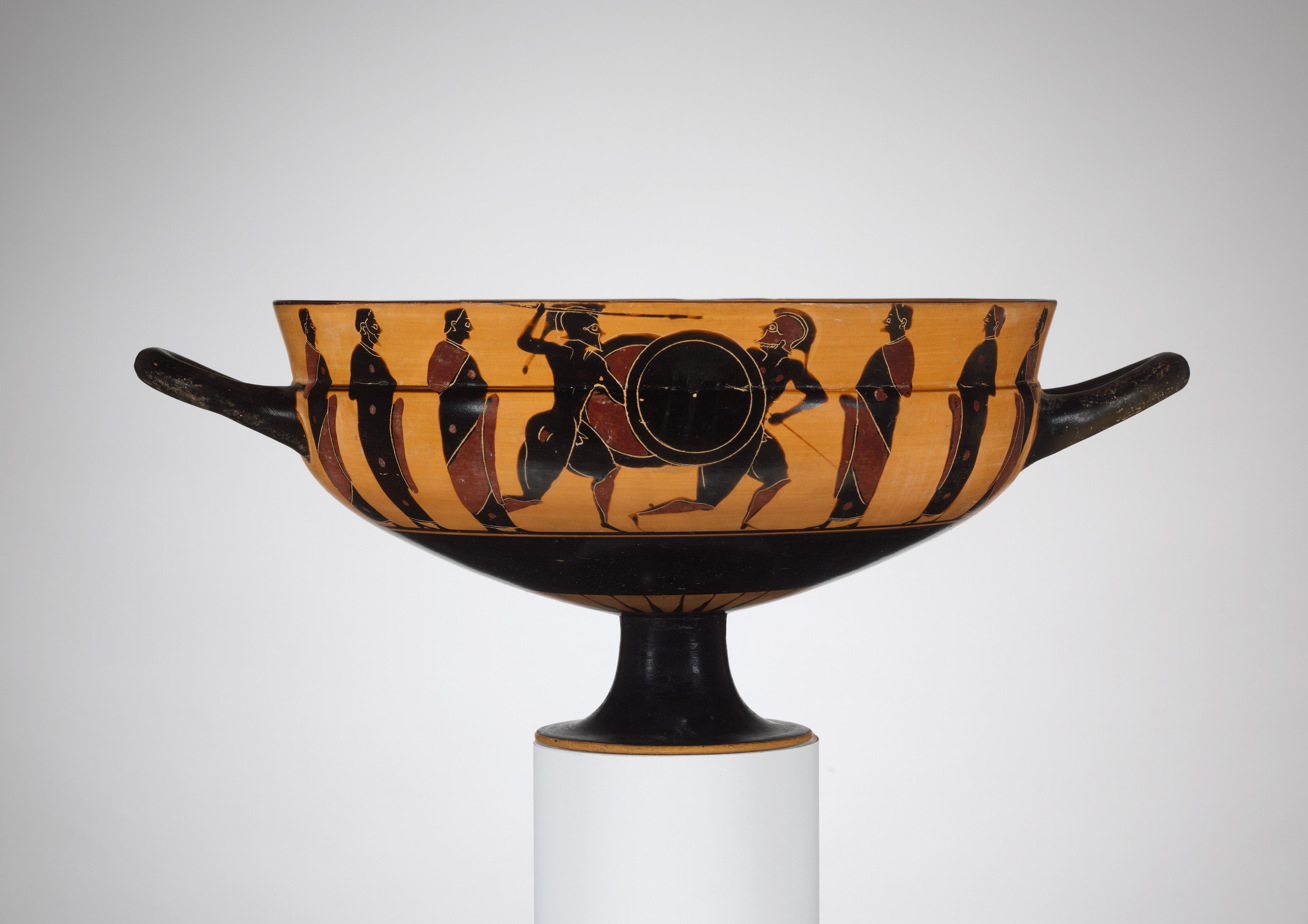
Siana cup shape

The vase has a height of 0.13 meters and the diameter is 0.25 meters. The style of the vase is called a Siana cup. The Siana cup shape is derived from another form of pottery known as the Komast cup. Characteristics of the Siana cup include a large deep bowl, a high lip, a high conical foot, and a decorated tondo. The handles are mounted on each side of the cup.

== Vase decoration ==
There are two types of decoration styles often associated with the Siana cup; overlap and double-decker. The decoration of the Boxing Siana Cup falls under the overlap style. In this system of decoration, the main body and the lip of the cup are used together as one area for decoration. The design was created using the black-figure technique, which was a common practice for pottery during the time period the cup was created. The painted design consists of three different figural scenes.

=== Side A ===
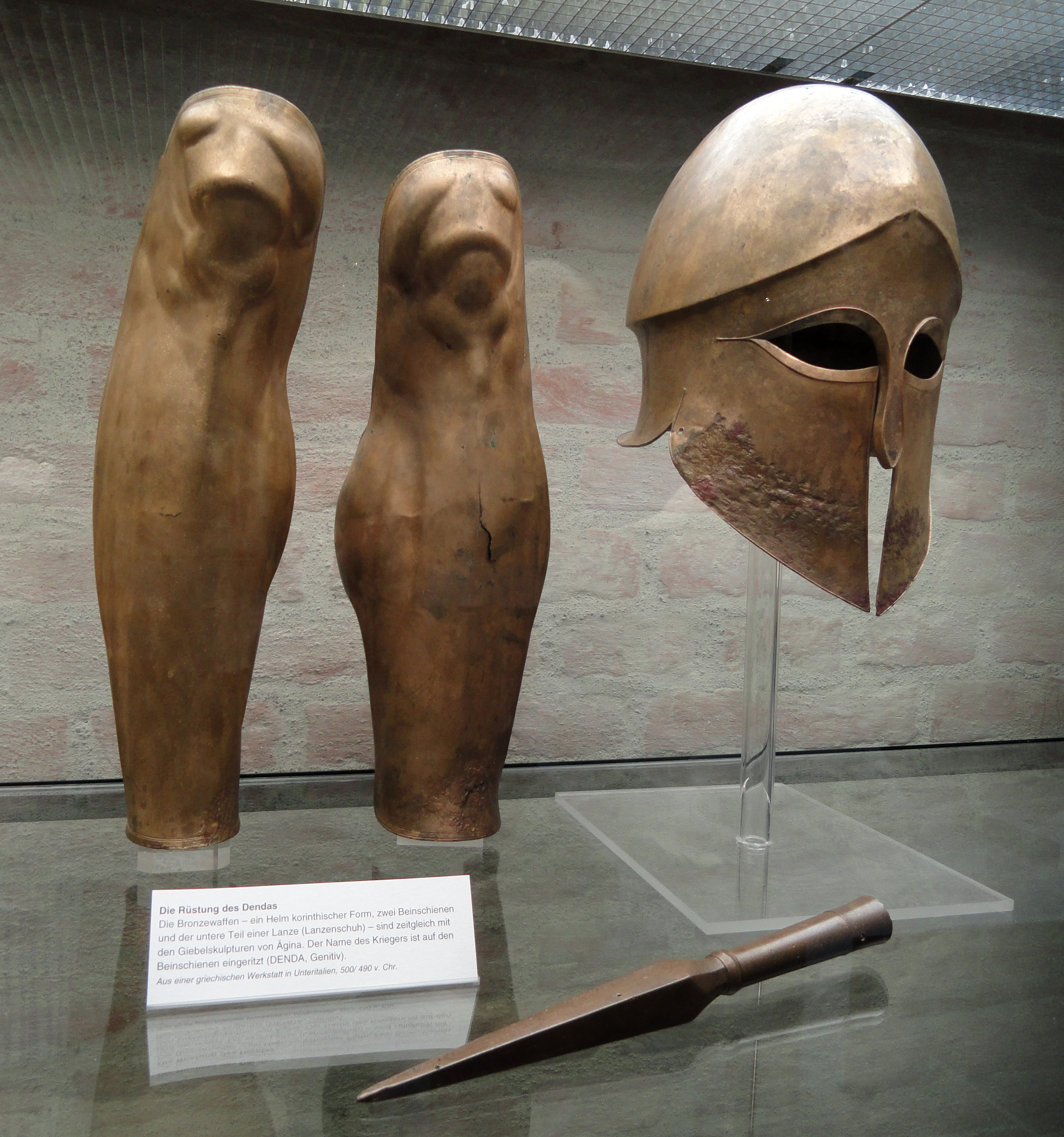
Greaves and Corinthian helmet: common Greek warfare items

One side of the vase, known as "Side A," depicts two warriors fighting. The two fighters are identified as warriors by their attire. They both wear helmets that cover their entire face, which distinguishes the helmets as Corinthian. For protection, the warriors hold shields and wear greaves on their legs. In their other hand, the fighters each hold a spear as their weapon and carry a sword at their waist. Each of these elements is typical of Greek warfare. Instead of a traditional shield, the soldier on the right uses a tripod, as seen by the tripod leg protruding from the base of the "shield" and stretching across the soldier's body. Despite the few elements identifying the fighters as warriors, the two soldiers are otherwise nude. The warriors are surrounded by figures that are described as spectators. Four spectators stand to the left of the battle scene and three stand on the right. The spectators are in an alternating pattern of being nude or clothed in drapes.

=== Side B ===
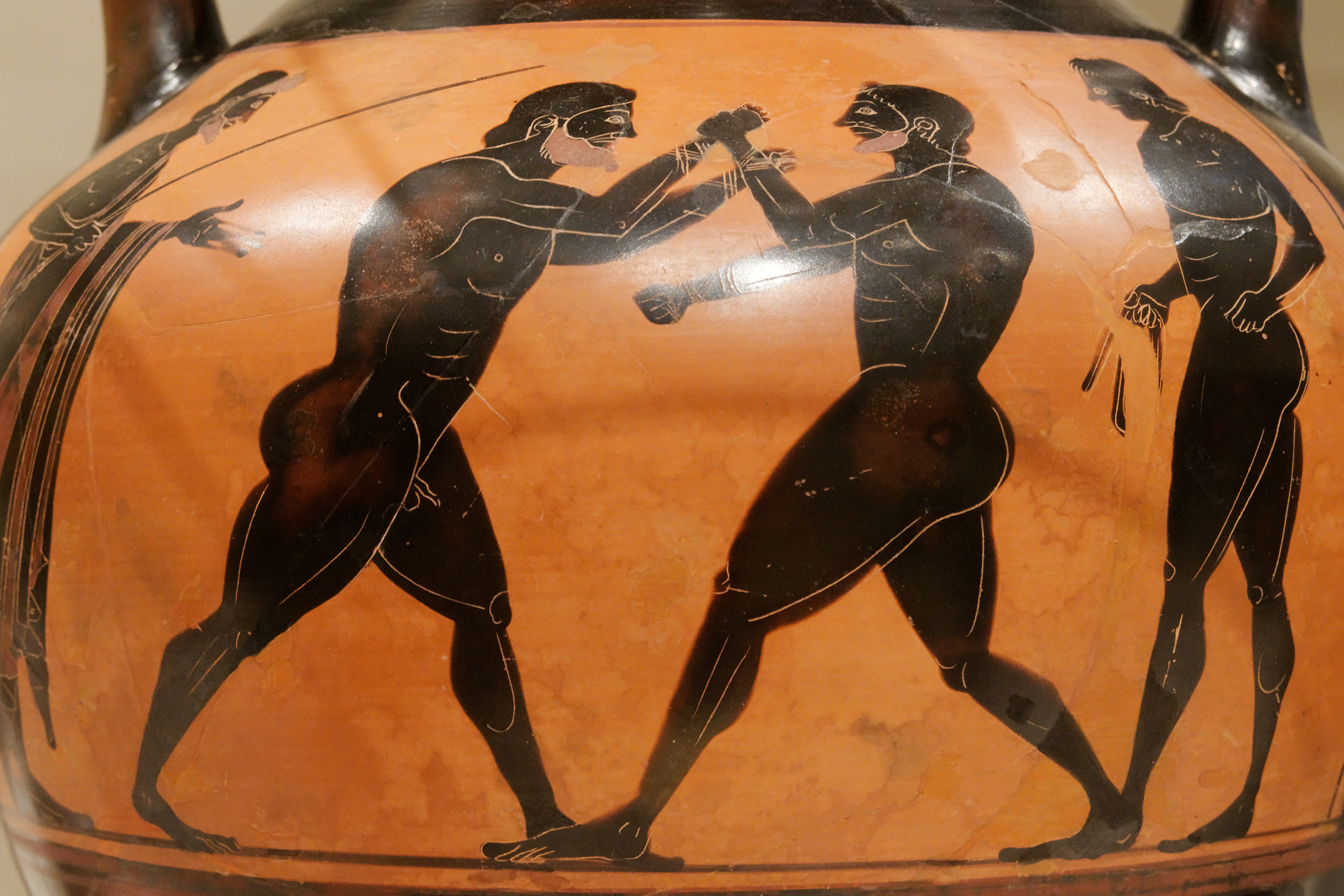
Depiction of ancient Greek boxing with leather wraps

The opposite side of the vase, called "Side B," contains an image similar to side A. Instead of warriors, two men are depicted boxing. Following the same theme as Side A, the boxers are nude except for the items that identify them as boxers. The fighters' hands and wrists are wrapped in leather thongs, which is what boxers commonly used for protection during standard boxing matches. The goal of ancient boxing was to knock the other opponent out by striking his head and upper body multiple times. There was little use of footwork in Greek boxing. Instead, boxers would stand in a stationary lunge-like position and rely on twisting at their hips for momentum. The boxers on the Boxing Siana Cup reflect this style of fighting. The fighters are portrayed standing with their legs planted far apart and the motion of the fight scene is depicted through their arms. Both boxers have one arm thrusting forward in a punch and the other arm pulled back in preparation to deliver another jab. Each man aims for his opponent's head and upper body. Like Side A, the boxers are surrounded by spectators on either side, in the same alternating pattern of clothed and unclothed.

=== Interior tondo ===
The interior of the cup depicts a single youth who is running and looking over his shoulder. Like Sides A and B, the man performing the athletic event is nude. However, unlike the exterior of the cup the youth is not surrounded by spectators; he is the lone image on the tondo.
