= Kabiria Group =

Type of Ancient Greek vase

The term Kabiria Group (also Kabiria vases, sometimes spelt Kabeiria or Cabeira) describes a type of Boeotian vases decorated in the black-figure technique. The term can also be used describe the artists producing vases of the type.

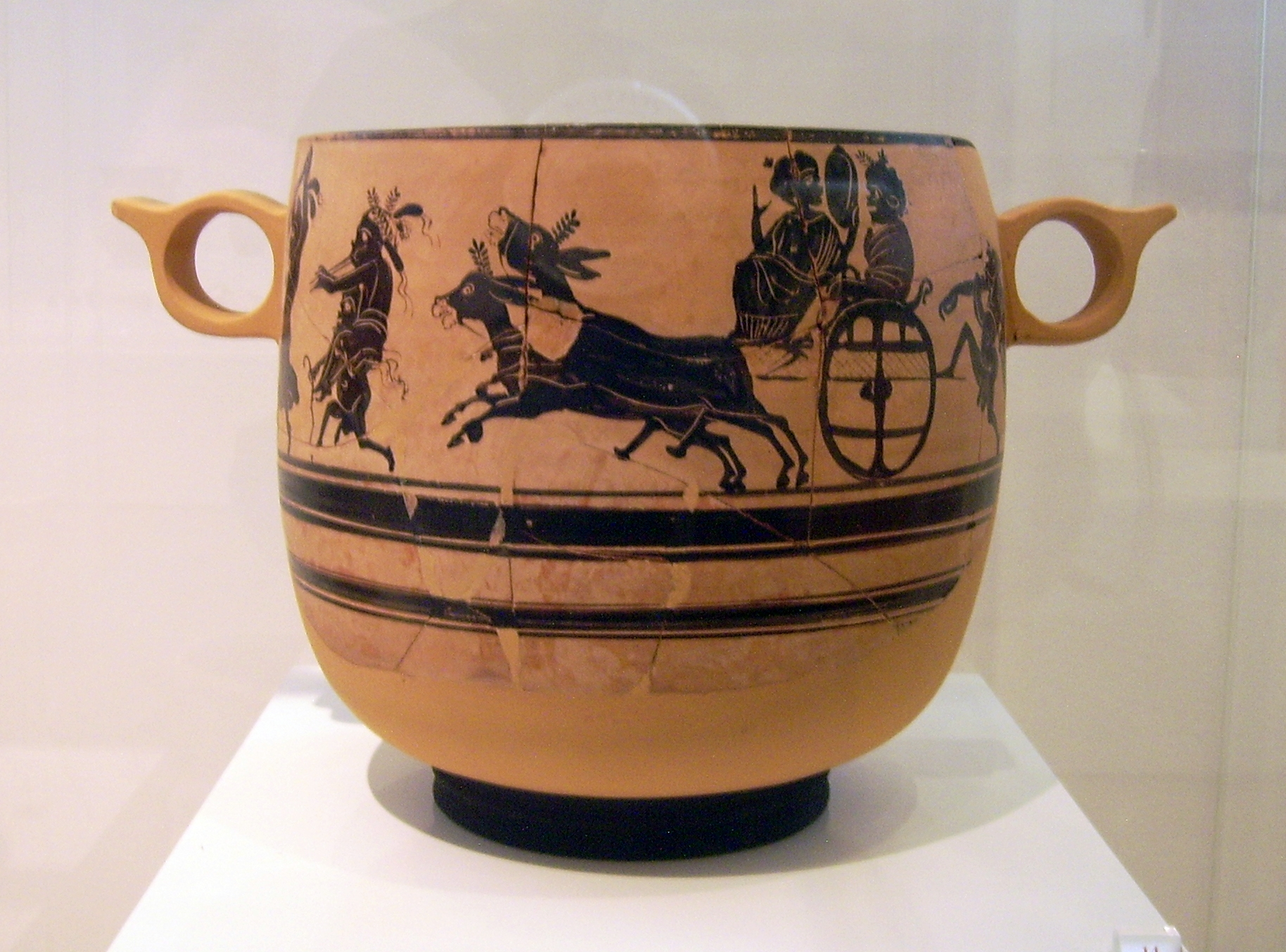
Kabirian skyphos. Procession to the sanctuary of the Kabiria, from Thebes. Mystai Painter. Late 5th, early 4th century BC.

== Style history ==
The Kabiria vases are the main style of black-figure vases from Boeotia. Their modern name is derived from the sanctuary of the Kabiria near Thebes, where the majority of such vases were found. They are also known from the graves of the Theban warriors fallen in the Battle of Chaironeia in 338 BC. The shapes painted in the style are usually skyphoi, and sometimes hemispherical kantharoi with vertical ring handles. Some shapes, such as lebes are totally absent, other, such as kylikes and pyxidai occur rarely. The vessels were produced from about 425/420 until 250 BC or a bit later. They depict cult scenes, usually caricatures of mythological events. There are also scenes depicting the symposia that took place at the sanctuary. The type's main characteristic is the humorous and exaggerated style of painting, although it is not present on all the vases, as more serious depictions of cult life also occur. The bulk of the vases is, in fact, decorated only with plant ornaments. Many are only painted on the front. Scholars recognise the hands of several individual artists, including the Mystai Painter.

== Bibliography ==
- John Boardman: Early Greek Vase Painting. 11th to 6th Century BC. A Handbook, Thames and Hudson, London 1998 (World of Art), 258 ISBN 0-500-20309-1
- Thomas Mannack: Griechische Vasenmalerei. Eine Einführung. Theiss, Stuttgart 2002, p. 129 ISBN 3-8062-1743-2.
- Matthias Steinhart: Schwarzfigurige Vasenmalerei. II. Ausserattisch, in: DNP 11 (2001), Col. 277
