= Kassandra Painter =

Greek vase painter

The Kassandra Painter (also Cassandra Painter) was an Attic vase painter in the black-figure style. His known works date to between 570 and 565 BC, and he was associated with the C Painter. The painter was identified by H.A.G. Bridjer.

A contemporary of the Heidelberg Painter, he decorated Siana cups with tall feet and rims. The vessels painted by him are of medium size. He is considered one of the first producers of Little-master cups. His conventional name is derived from a depiction of Kassandra on one of his cups.

== Bibliography ==
- Thomas Mannack: Griechische Vasenmalerei. Eine Einführung, Thesis, Stuttgart 2002, p. 110. ISBN 3-8062-1743-2
