= KX Painter =

Ancient Greek vase painter

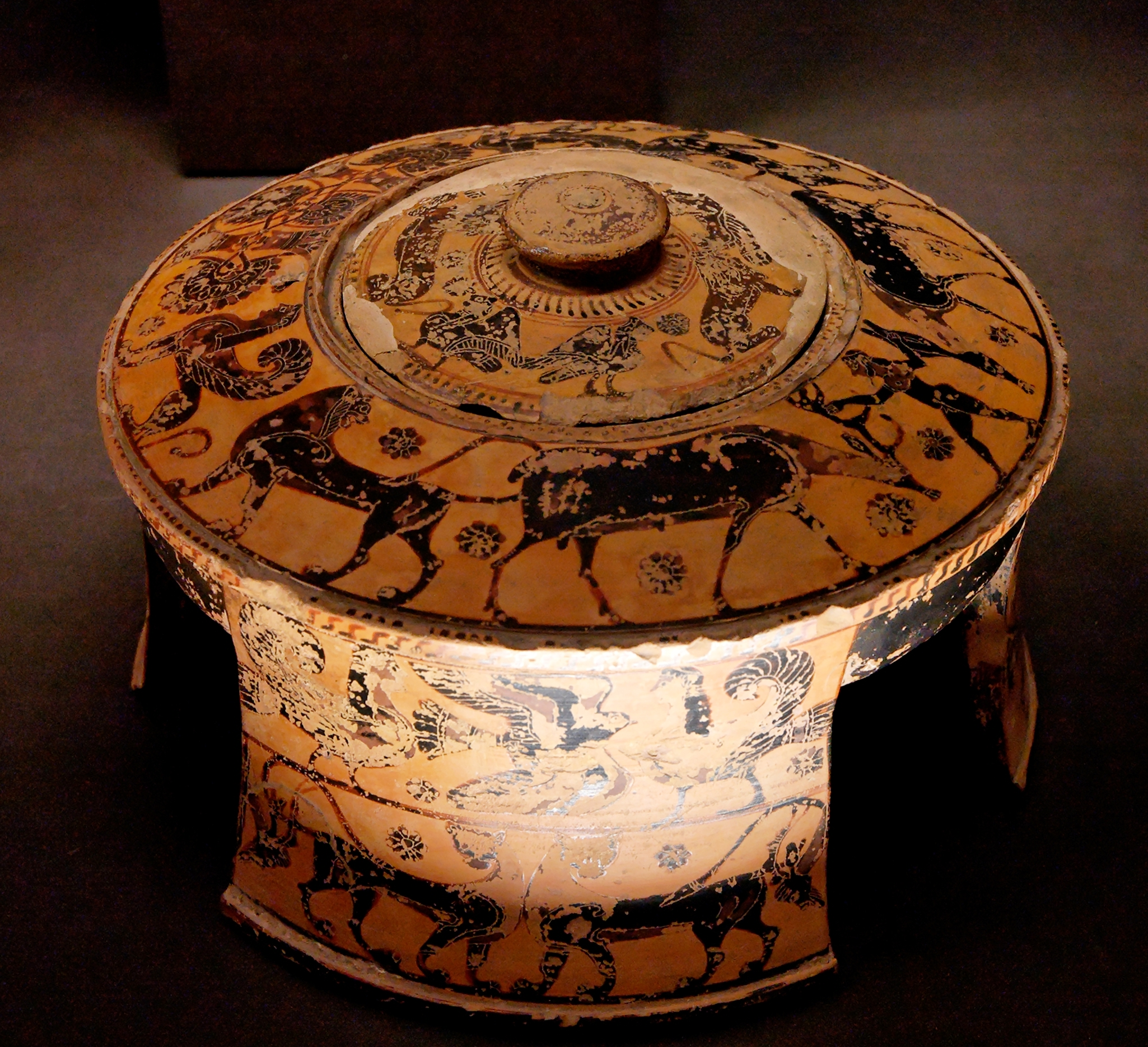
A tripod exaleiptron by the KX Painter, circa 580/570 BC, found in Aegina; now Louvre CA 927

The KX Painter was an Attic black-figure vase painter. He was active between 585 and 570 BC. Besides the KY Painter, the KX Painter was the main representative of the Comast Group, which succeeded the Gorgon Painter. His conventional name was allocated by John Beazley. He is considered the better and chronologically somewhat earlier representative of the group. He was the first painter in Athens to occasionally depict komasts on his vases, a motif adopted from Corinthian vase painting. He mainly painted skyphoi, lekanes, kothones and Komast cups. In contrast to later representatives of the group, he still mostly painted animals, in a more careful and powerful style than the Gorgon Painter. Some mythological scenes by him are also known. Especially famous are his small-format mythical scenes placed within animal friezes. The KX Painter can be considered the first Attic painter to achieve a quality at par with that reached in Corinth, then the dominant centre of Greek vase painting. Imitations of his works are known from Boeotia.

== Bibliography ==
- John Beazley: Attic Black-figure Vase-painters. Oxford 1956, p. 23-28.
- John Boardman: Schwarzfigurige Vasen aus Athen. Ein Handbuch, von Zabern, 4. edn, Mainz 1994 (Kulturgeschichte der Antiken Welt, Vol 1) ISBN 3-8053-0233-9, p. 19.
