= East Greek Bird Bowl =

Type in ancient Greek pottery

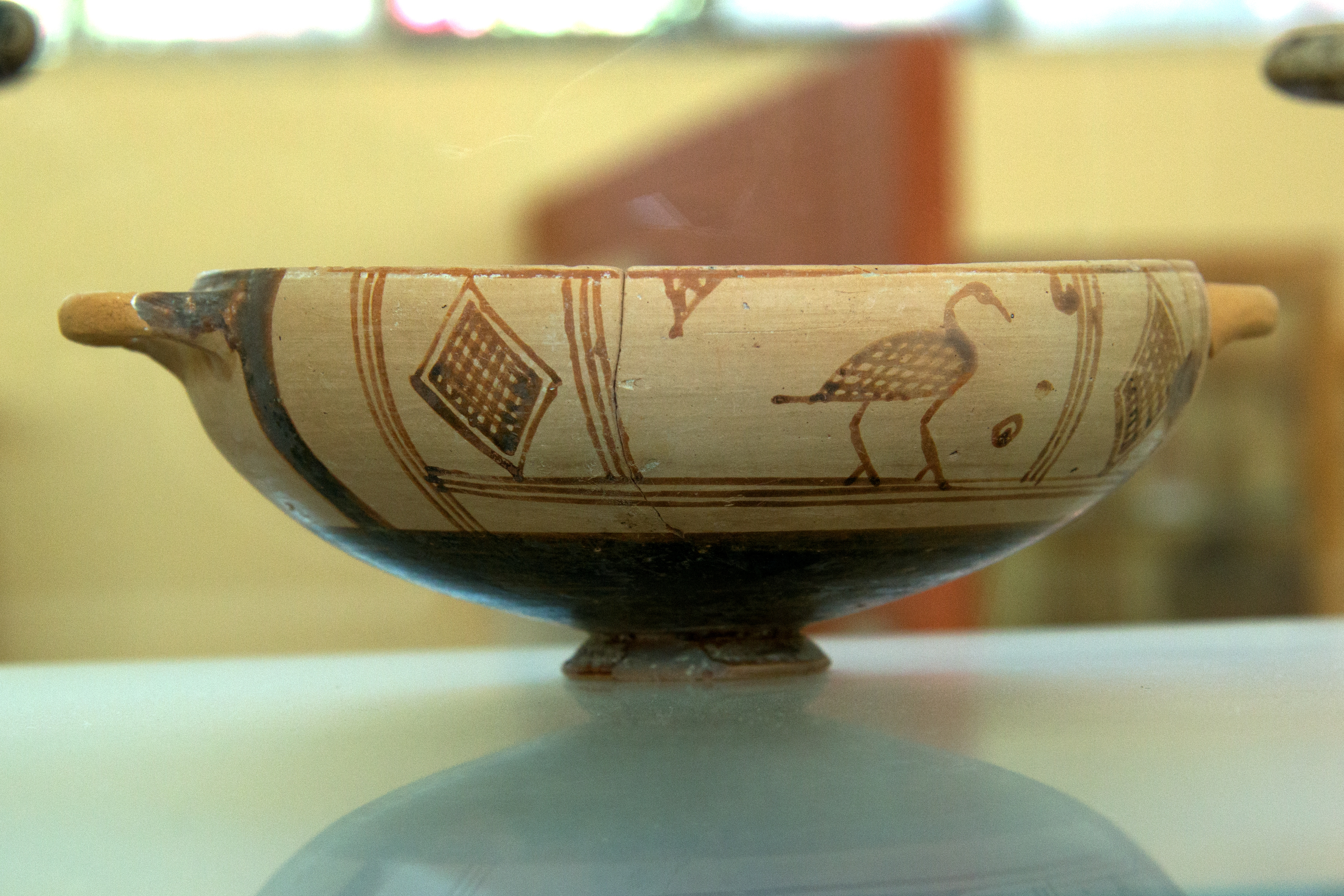
Bowl from Paros, probably end of 8th century BC. Archaeological museum of Paros

The East Greek Bird Bowl is an early type of vessel produced by East Greek vase painting.

The East Greek Bird Bowl developed around 700 BC, probably in northern Ionia, from the bird-kotyle. Although they are subgeometric in style, they belong to Orientalising period of Ancient Greek vase painting. On average, the cups have a diameter of 15 cm. Usually, they are decorated with three rectangular metope-like panels. The central, elongated one holds the depiction of a diagonally hatched bird. The side panels are decorated with hatched rhomboids.

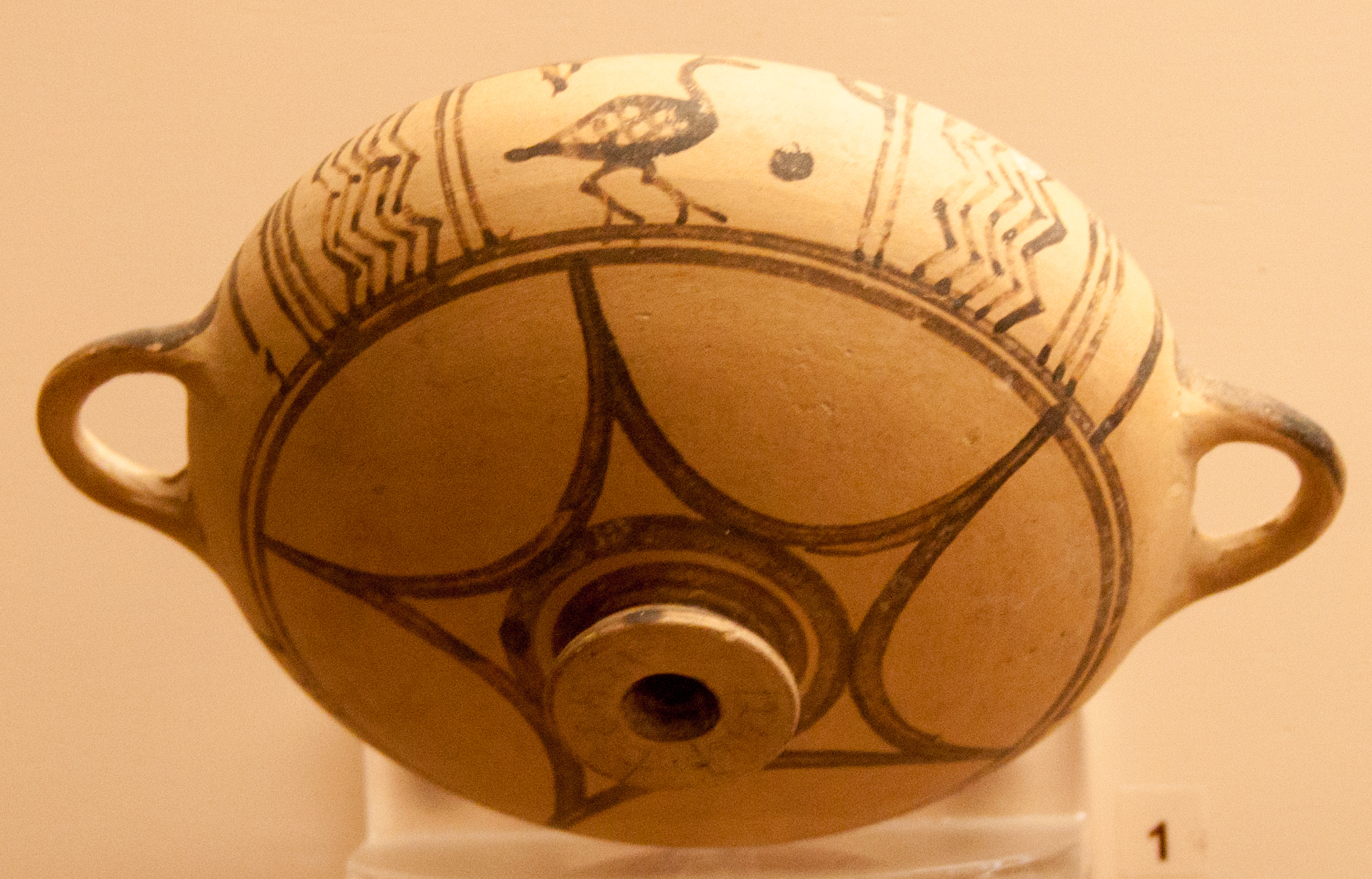
From Rhodes, 625-575 BC

The earliest bird cups have a small ledge under the rim and additional row of dots under the decoration, below which the body is painted in solid black. Around 675 BC the ledge and dots were abandoned, from about 640 onwards, the originally black-painted bottom of the bowl was left in natural clay colour, but often decorated with a star or five rays. The hatched rhomboids were also replaced with small ray or tongue patterns. Around 615 BC, the separating lines between the metopes or panels disappeared. Around the same time, the ring base was replaced by a flat base with a concave centre. The production of bird cups ended after about a century, around 600 BC. They were succeeded by rosette cups. Apart from the East Greek bird bowl, during the Orientalising period, there was also a Boeotian Bird Bowl.

== Bibliography ==
- Thomas Mannack: Griechische Vasenmalerei. Eine Einführung. Theiss, Stuttgart 2002, p. 91 ISBN 3-8062-1743-2.
