= Comast Group =

Group of Attic vase painters

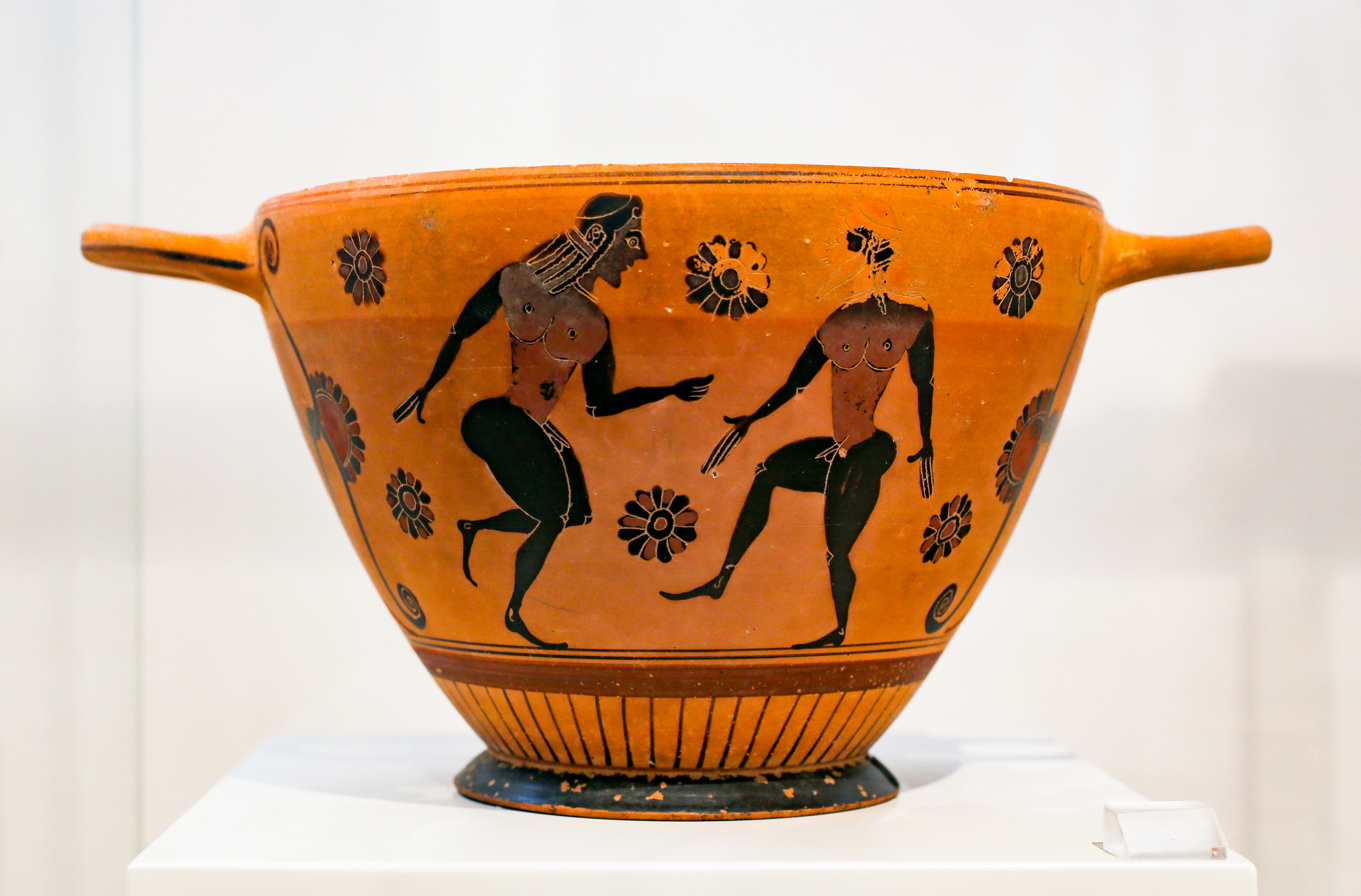
Cup produced in Athens, painted by KX Painter from the Komast Group, ca. 580-570 BC

The Comast Group (also Komast Group) was a group of Attic vase painters in the black-figure style. The works of its members are dated to between 585 and 570/560 BC. The artists of the Komast Group are seen as the successors of the Gorgon Painter. Its most important representatives were the KX Painter and the slightly later KY Painter. They painted vases shapes that had been newly introduced to Athens or that had not previously been painted. Especially commonly painted by them were '’kothon’’ and lekanis. From Corinth, then still the centre of Greek vase painting, they adopted the Komast cup and the skyphos (known as kotyle. The KY Painter introduced the column krater. Also popular at the time was the kantharos. The group adopted the Corinthian habit of depicting komasts, after which the group is named. It provided the group’s most commonly painted motif. The komast scenes permit Attic artists for the first time to reach the artistic levels of middle-ranking Corinthian vases. While the older KX Painter still mostly painted animals and only the occasional komast scene, the komos became a standard motif for the KY painter and further inferior successors. It is not clear to what extent the painters of the group really cooperated. It is possible that they all worked in the same workshop. The group influenced later Attic vase painters, including the Heidelberg Painter. Works by the Komast Group were not only found in Attica, but appear to have been exported widely. Vases and fragments have been found at many sites, including Naukratis, Rhodes, Central Italy, Taras, and even Corinth.

== Bibliography ==
- John Beazley: Attic Black-figure Vase-painters. Oxford 1956, p. 23–37.
- John Boardman: Schwarzfigurige Vasen aus Athen. Ein Handbuch, von Zabern, 4. edn, Mainz 1994 (Kulturgeschichte der Antiken Welt, Vol 1) ISBN 3-8053-0233-9, p. 19.
