= C Painter =

6th-century BC Greek vase painter

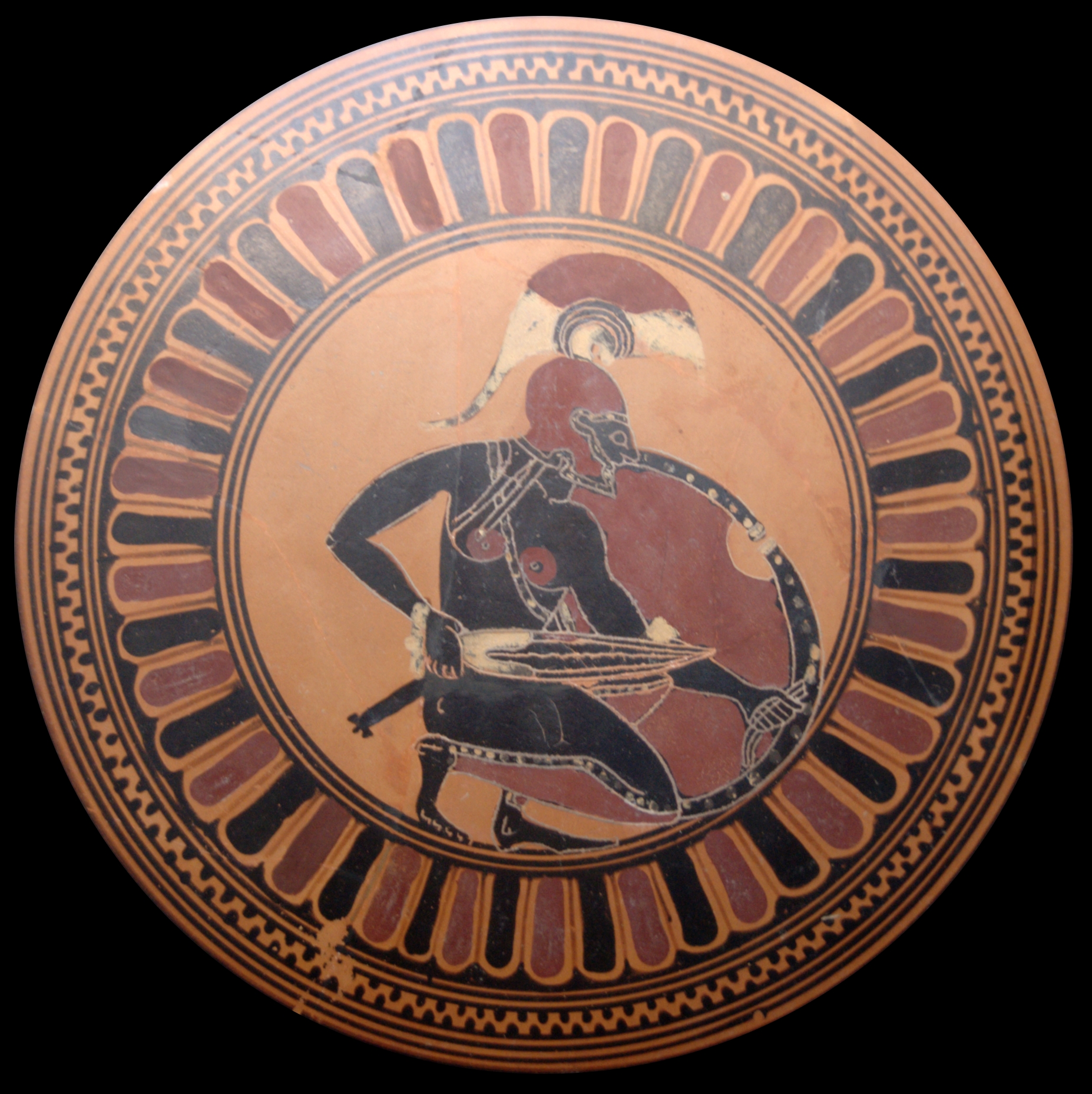
Inside of a Siana cup: a squatting warrior brandishing a sword; perhaps Achilles awaiting Troilos. '’Circa’’ 560 BC. Munich: Staatliche Antikensammlungen

The C Painter was one of the most important Attic black-figure vase painters. His works date to circa 575–550 BC. His conventional name was allocated by the archaeologist John Beazley. The C stands for "Corinthianising", a reference to the strong influence of Corinthian vase painting on the artist. He was successor to the Comast Group and used the relatively old-fashioned range of vessel shapes preferred by that group, including lekanis, tripod kothon and skyphos. In contrast, he also painted quite innovative lekythoi with pronounced shoulders, although the more conservative Deinaeira type was still in use by some workshops at his time. The C Painter was the first Attic vase painter to paint cups without an offset lip, the Merrythought cup.

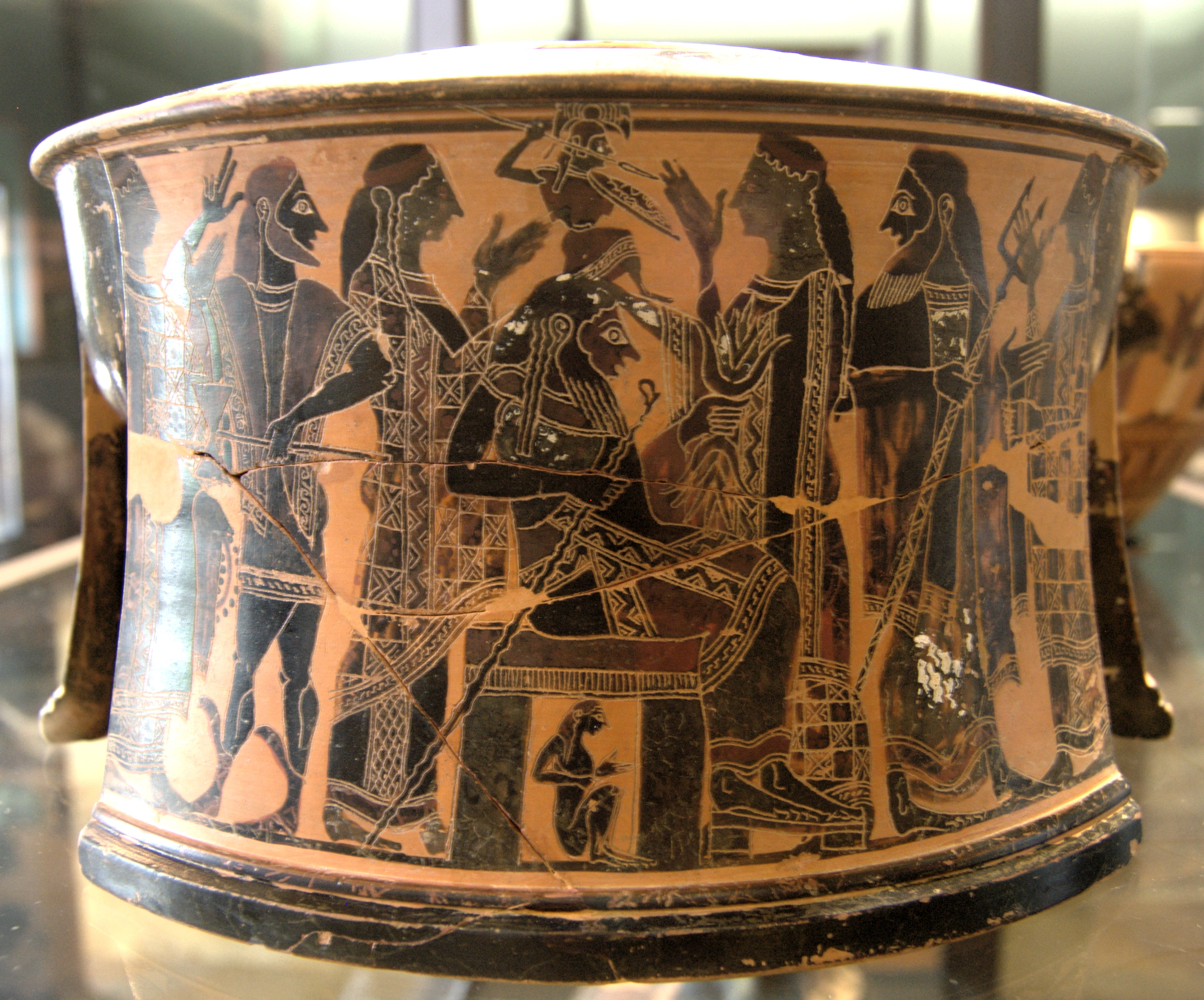
Birth of Athena, exaleiptron, about 570/60 BC.

As indicated by his conventional name, the C Painter followed Corinthian precedents. He painted duelling warriors, horsemen, symposiasts, and komasts. He followed the Corinthian habit of adding white paint for details, but used the Attic technique of doing so: the white paint was added onto the black slip, rather than directly to the base clay. His mythological images represent a departure from Corinthian precedents. He painted them in elongated friezes, resembling the work of the Gorgon Painter or Kleitias. His powerful figures are carefully painted, often with a somewhat enlarged head. A characteristic feature of his work are animal heads used as shield emblazonments. Especially important is his work as a painter of Siana cups. He is considered the earliest and best painter of that shape. Probably towards the end of his career, his workshop produced cups resembling the later lip cups. His most famous work is the lid of a lekanis, now on display in Naples. It bears the earliest known depiction of the death of Astyanax. One vase by the C painter bears the remainder of an inscription: …eiron epoie (..eiron made it), suggesting that his real name was Cheiron or Pheiron.

== Bibliography ==
- John Beazley: Attic Black-figure Vase-painters. Oxford 1956, p.
- John Boardman: Schwarzfigurige Vasen aus Athen. Ein Handbuch, von Zabern, 4. edn, Mainz 1994 (Kulturgeschichte der Antiken Welt, Vol 1) ISBN 978-3-8053-0233-3, p. 35f.
- Thomas Mannack: Griechische Vasenmalerei. Eine Einführung. Theiss, Stuttgart 2002 ISBN 978-3-8062-1743-8, p. 109f.
