= Heidelberg Painter =

Ancient Greek vase painter

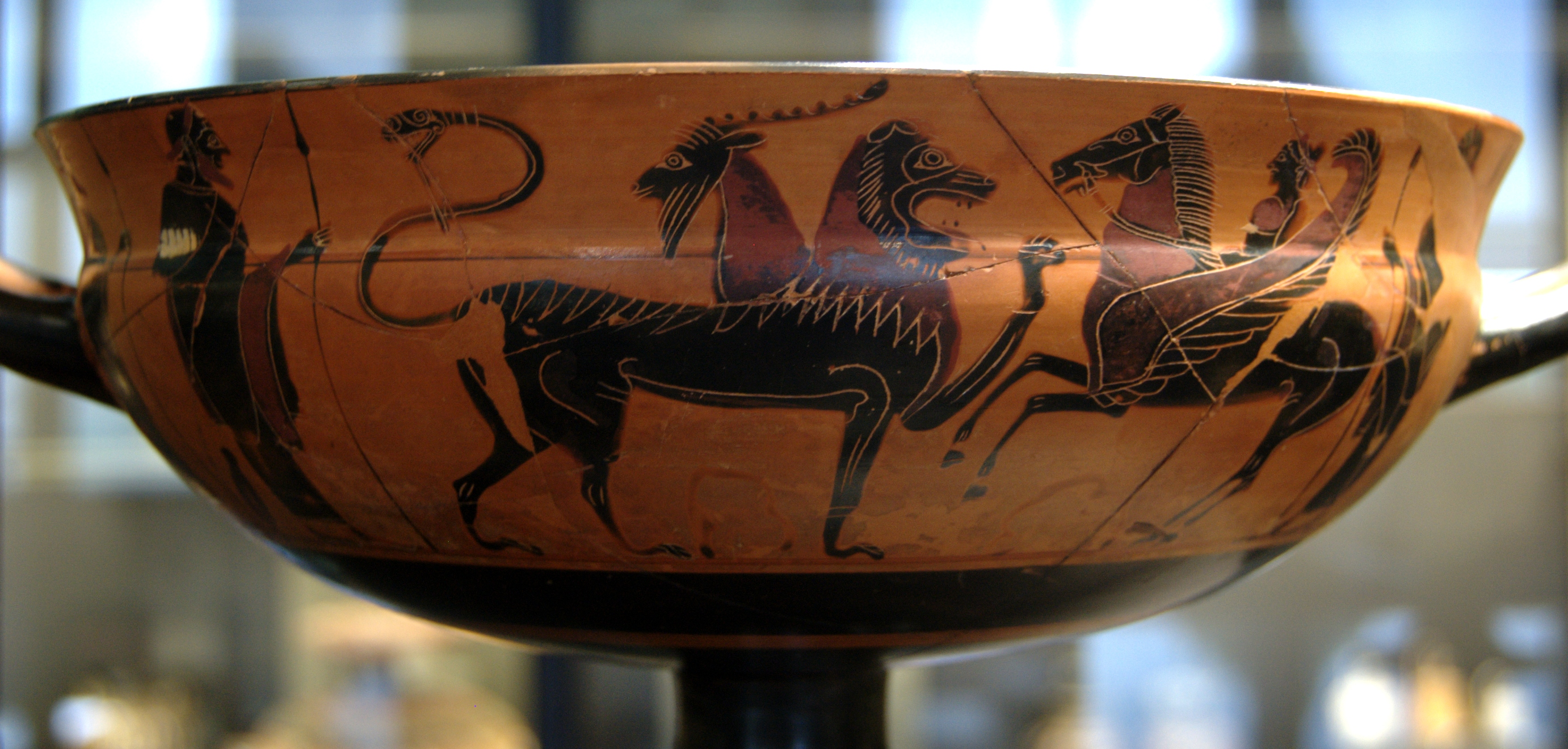
- Double decker Siana cup, Bellerophontes fighting a chimaera, circa 575/550 BC. The Louvre
- Born: Unknown; Before 575 BC; Probably Athens
- Died: c. 555 BC
- Known for: Vase painting
- Movement: Black-figure style

The Heidelberg Painter (conventional name) was an Attic vase painter of the black-figure style, active c. 575–555 BC. He is considered one of the most important painters of Siana cups. Along with the C Painter, he is considered the main representative of his style. Generally, the Heidelberg Painter is regarded as the more accomplished artist of the two, although his work did not reach the same breadth of scope. In contrast to many of his contemporaries, he placed special emphasis on the depiction of human figures, at which he was very adept. His figures are very detailed, but often drawn rather sloppily. His early works resemble those of the Comast Group, the later ones those of the Amasis Painter.

== Bibliography ==
- John Boardman: Schwarzfigurige Vasen aus Athen. Ein Handbuch, von Zabern, 4. edn, Mainz 1994 (Kulturgeschichte der Antiken Welt, Vol 1) ISBN 3-8053-0233-9
- Herman A. G. Brijder: Siana cups. Vol. 2: The Heidelberg painter, Amsterdam 1991
