= Painter of the Dresden Lekanis =

The Painter of the Dresden Lekanis is the common name for a vase painter of the Attic black-figure style, active around 580–570 BC. He immigrated to Boeotia and is in fact identical with the Boeotian Horse-bird Painter.

His conventional name is derived from his name vase, a lekanis at Dresden (Inv. ZV 1464). A typical feature of his works are animal friezes, especially with sirens; their execution has been characterised by John Boardman as a caricature of the figures by the KX Painter. His works have been found not only in Attica, but also in Taranto, Smyrna and Ampurias (Spain).

The majority if his vases are made of a lighter-coloured clay, then usual for Attic vases, which explains his immigration to Boeotia, where such clay was in use. In Boeotia, his painting style became coarser, but his specific style with characteristic incisions and the use of additional colours leaves no doubt as to the identity of the painter. His production in Boeotia was much more extensive than previously in Athens. More than 60 vases by him are known, the majority are alabastra. He maintained his predilection for sirens. His works were apparently all discovered in Greece, predominantly in Boeotia.

== Bibliography ==
- John Beazley: Attic Black-figure Vase-painters, Oxford 1956, p. 21-23. 680.
- John D. Beazley: Paralipomena. Additions to Attic Black-figure Vase-painters and to Attic Red-figure Vase-painters, Oxford 1971, p. 14.
- John Boardman: Schwarzfigurige Vasen aus Athen. Ein Handbuch, von Zabern, Mainz 1977 (Kulturgeschichte der Antiken Welt, Vol 1) ISBN 3-8053-0233-9, p. 22.
- Karl Kilinski II: Boeotian black figure vase painting of the archaic period, Mainz 1990, p. 7-13.
