= Merrythought cup =

The term Merrythought cup is used by scholars to describe a specific type of Attic kylix.

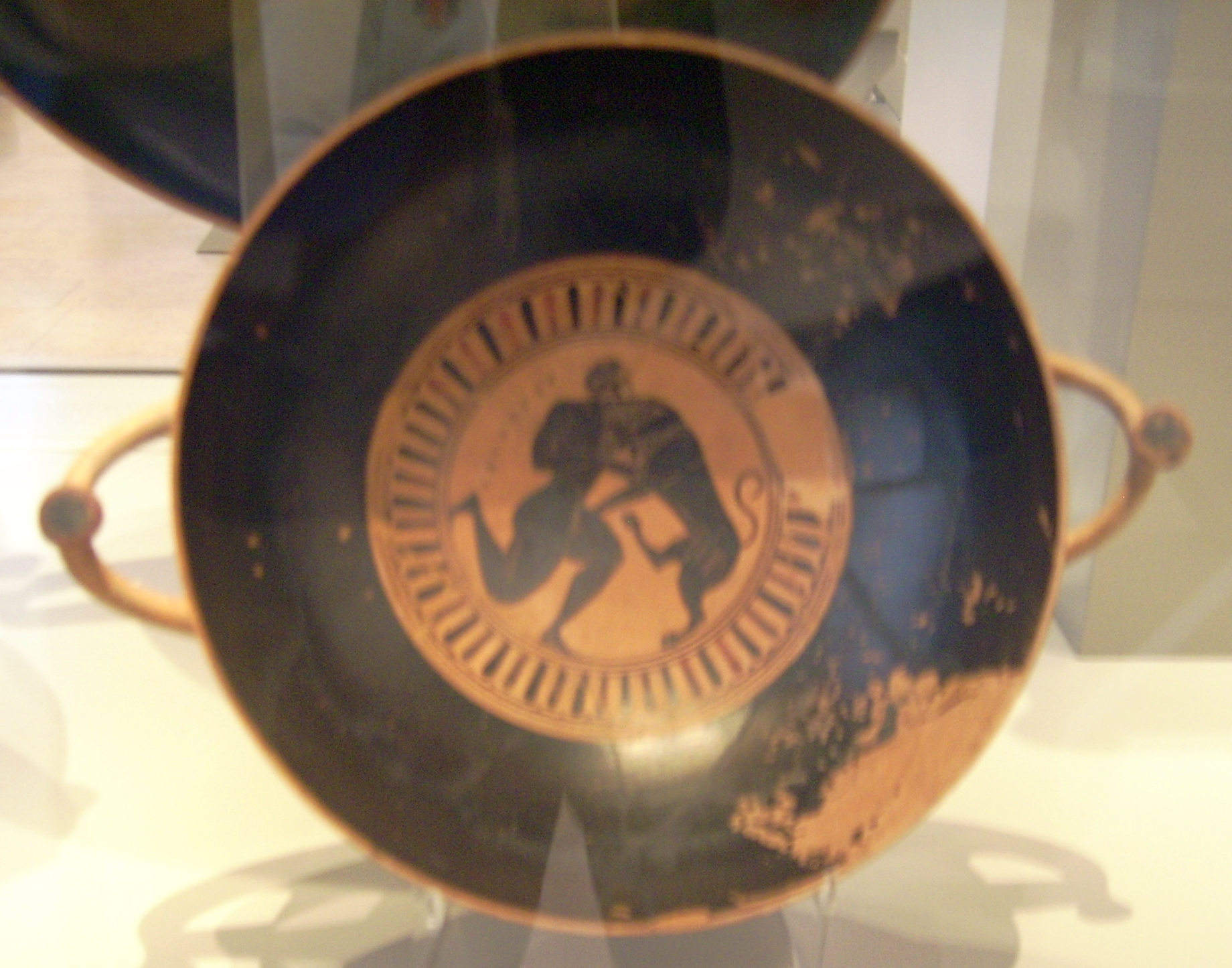
Attic Merrythought Cup, Antikensammlung Berlin.

The Merrythought cup, named after the British word for "wishbone," probably developed as a refined form of a rural cup type normally made of wood. The shape features several peculiarities. It is the first Attic cup shape that lacks a distinctive break between lip and vessel body. The shape of the handles, which give the vessel its name, are in the oblong wishbone shape, with a knob shape on the curve of the handle. Rather than forming a semi-circle, as is the case in virtual all other cup shapes. Equally unusual, the handles extend beyond the height of the vessel body. The cups, mostly covered in black slip, occasionally feature thin stripes of red paint on the foot or the interior. This resembles East Greek and other Attic decorative styles. The vase body is nearly hemispherical. The first Attic artist to decorate Merrythought cups in the black-figure style was the C Painter.

== Bibliography ==
- John Boardman: Schwarzfigurige Vasen aus Athen. Ein Handbuch, von Zabern, Mainz 1977 (Kulturgeschichte der Antiken Welt, Vol 1) ISBN 3-8053-0233-9, p. 36.
- Ramage, Nancy Hirschland. “A Merrythought Cup from Sardis.” American Journal of Archaeology, vol. 87, no. 4, Archaeological Institute of America, 1983, pp. 453–60, doi:10.2307/504103.
