= Matthias Steinhart =

Matthias Steinhart (born 17 April 1966 in Freiburg im Breisgau) is a German Classical archaeologist.

== Life and work ==
After attending the humanistic Scheffel-Gymnasium in Lahr, Matthias Steinhart studied classical archaeology, Greek philology, and ancient history at Bonn University and Würzburg University from 1985 to 1994 (from 1998 with a scholarship from the Studienstiftung). In 1990 he received his masters and in 1994 he achieved a doctorate with the dissertation "Das Motiv des Auges in der griechischen Bildkunst" (The Motif of the Eye in Greek Art," supervised by Erika Simon.

From the middle of 1998 until the middle of 2000, Steinhart was employed by the Freiburg University ancient history department on Hans-Joachim Gehrke and Eckhard Wirbelauer's research project "Antiken von Ithaka – ein imaginäres Museum" (Antiquities of Ithaca: an imaginary museum). After this he was employed by the same institution for two more years, as a member of sub-project B 1 "Römisch-imperiale und regionale Identitäten und ihr Wechselspiel im östlichen Imperium Romanum" (Roman Imperial and Regional Identities and their Interaction in the Eastern Roman Empire), part of special research area 541 "Identitäten und Alteritäten. Die Funktion von Alterität für die Konstitution und Konstruktion von Identität" (Identities and Otherings. The Function of Othering for the Constitution and Construction of Identity). Steinhart investigated Pausanias and the cultural identity of Greece in Roman times. During this period, he completed his habilitation in 2001 at Freiburg University. From 2002 to 2005, Steinhart was a research assistant, from 2005 to 2006 was a member of the academic council, and since 2006, has been a Privatdozent at the Archaeological Institute of Freiburg University.

Since 1 January 2008, Steinhart has been conservator at the Staatliche Antikensammlungen and Glyptothek in Munich. On 26 August 2008 he received his Umhabilitation from LMU Munich. Since 1 December 2011, he has held the chair of Classical Archaeology at Würzburg University. In addition, he is in charge of the antiquities collection of the university's Martin von Wagner Museum. In 2014, he was made a member of the Bavarian Academy of Sciences and Humanities.

== Selected writings ==
- Das Motiv des Auges in der griechischen Bildkunst (The Motif of the Eye in Greek Art), von Zabern, Mainz 1995 ISBN 3-8053-1792-1 (= Dissertation)
- Töpferkunst und Meisterzeichnung. Attische Wein- und Ölgefässe aus der Sammlung Zimmermann (Ceramic Art and Masters' art: Attic Wine and Oil amphorae in the Sammlung Zimmermann), von Zabern, Mainz 1996 ISBN 3-8053-1896-0
- with Friedhelm Hoffmann, Tiere vom Nil (Animals of the Nile), Reichert, Wiesbaden 2001 (Ägyptische Terrakotten in Würzburg (Schenkung Gütte), Heft 1) ISBN 3-89500-225-9
- with Eckhard Wirbelauer: Aus der Heimat des Odysseus. Reisende, Grabungen und Funde auf Ithaka und Kephallenia bis zum ausgehenden 19. Jahrhundert (From the Homeland of Odysseus. Travels, Excavations, and Discoveries from Ithaka and Kephallenia to the end of the Nineteenth Century), van Zabern, Mainz 2002 (Kulturgeschichte der antiken Welt, Vol. 87) ISBN 3-8053-2835-4
- Die Kunst der Nachahmung. Darstellungen mimetischer Vorführungen in der griechischen Bildkunst archaischer und klassischer Zeit (The Art of Imitation. Depictions of Actors in Greek Art of the Archaic and Classical Periods), von Zabern, Mainz 2004 ISBN 3-8053-3338-2 (= Habilitationsschrift)
- Bilder der virtus. Tafelsilber der Kaiserzeit und die großen Vorbilder Roms: Die Lanx von Stráže (Images and Virtues. Table Silver of the Imperial period and the Great Models of Rome: The Lanx of Stráže). Steiner, Stuttgart 2009 ISBN 978-3-515-09631-7 (Collegium Beatus Rhenanus, Band 2)
