= Cotyla =

The cotylae are also features on the proximal end of the radius and of the ulna in birds.

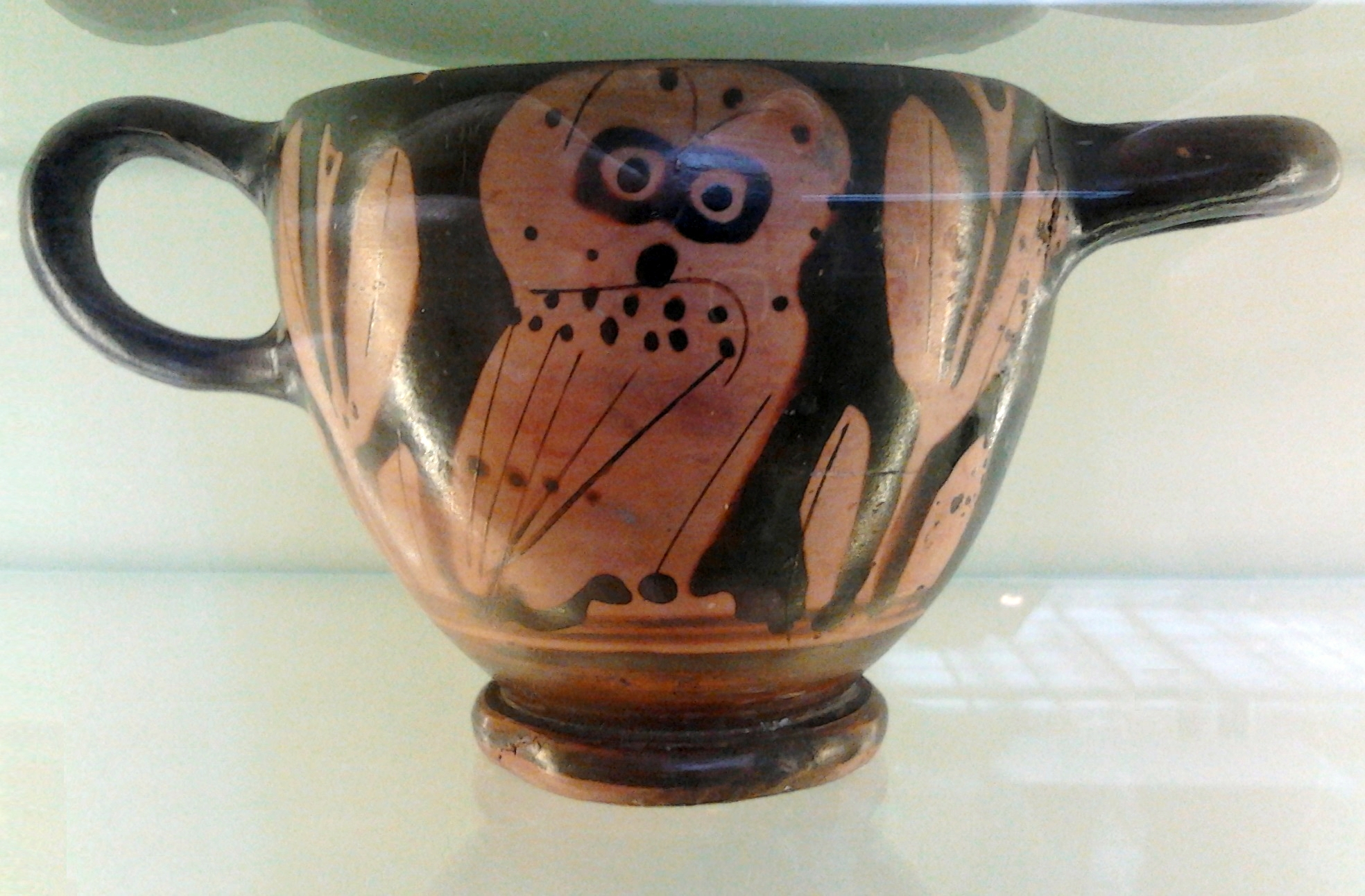
Attic cotyla cup with an owl (5th century BC), National Museum, in Warsaw

In classical antiquity, the cotyla or cotyle (from Ancient Greek κοτύλη (kotúlē), 'cup, bowl') was a measure of capacity among the Greeks and Romans: by the latter it was also called hemina; by the former, τρυβλίον and ἡμίνα or ἡμίμνα. It was the half of the sextarius or ξέστης, and contained six cyathi, or nearly half a pint English.

This measure was used by physicians with a graduated scale marked on it for measuring out given weights of fluids, especially oil. A vessel or horn, of a cubic or cylindrical shape, and of the capacity of a cotyla, was divided into twelve equal parts by lines cut on its side. The whole vessel was called litra, and each of the parts an ounce (uncia). This measure held nine ounces (by weight) of oil, so that the ratio of the weight of the oil to the number of ounces it occupied in the measure would be 9:12 or 3:4.

Nicolas Chorier (1612–1692) observes that the cotyla was used as a dry measure as well as a liquid one, from the authority of Thucydides, who in one place mentions two cotylae of wine, and in another two cotylae of bread.

The name is also given to a type of ancient Greek vase broadly similar in shape to a skyphos but more closely resembling a kantharos.

== See also ==
- Nestor's Cup
