= Komast cup =

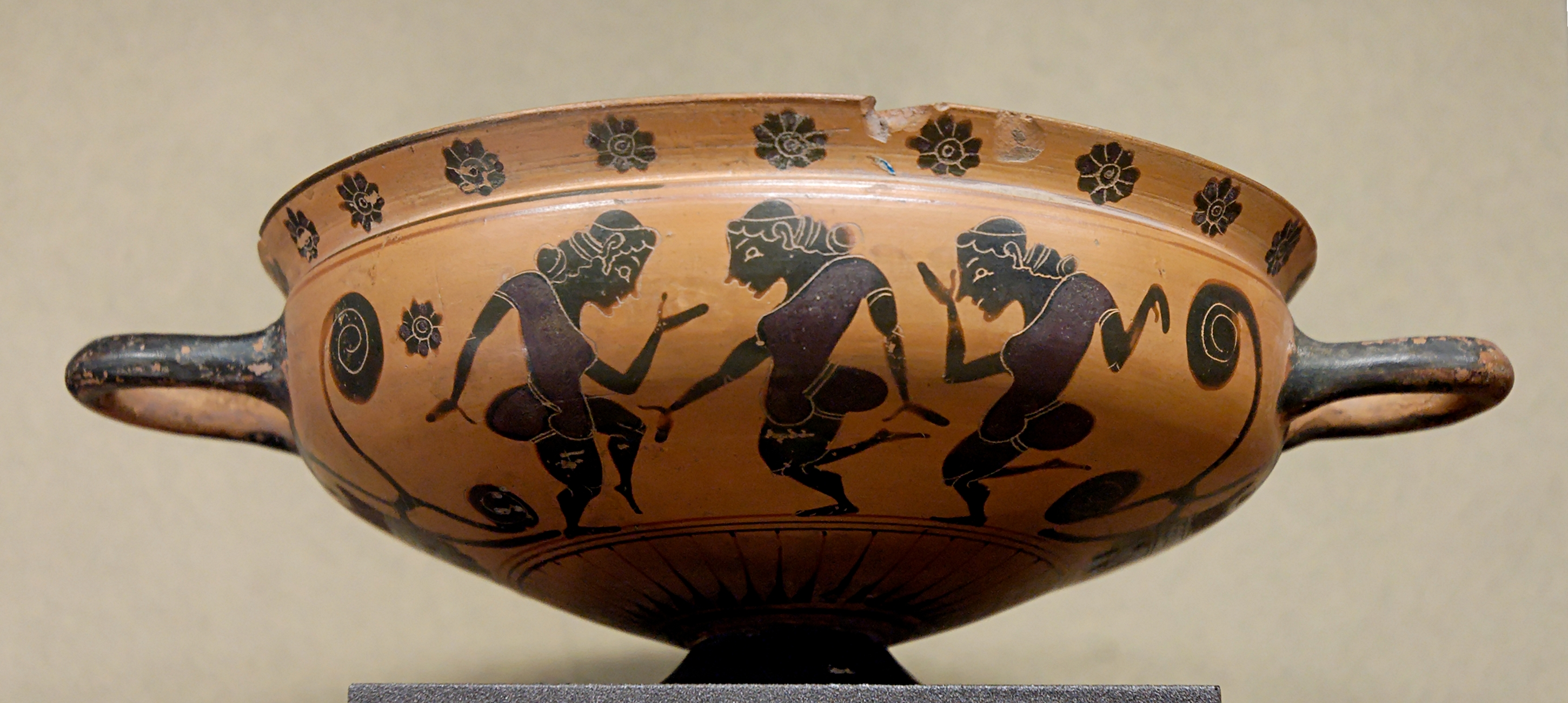
Attic komast cup, Louvre

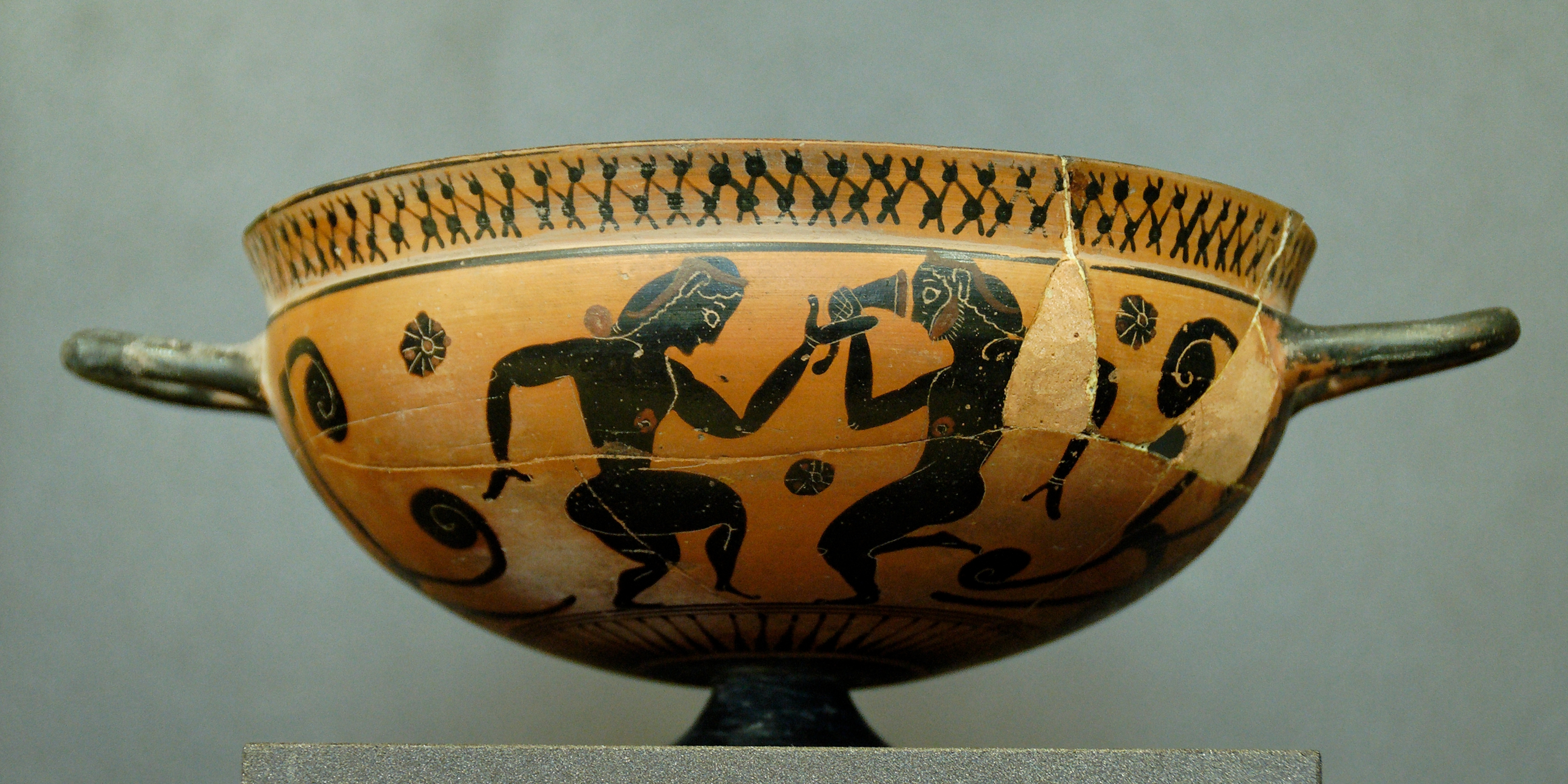
Komast cup by the Falmouth Painter, c. 560 BC, Louvre

The Komast cup (also Comast cup) is a cup shape at the beginning of the development of Attic drinking cups. Komast cups were widespread especially in Ionia and Corinth. Like other vase painters of the time, the Attic painters were under strong influence from Corinthian vase painting.

The name is derived from the artists' preferred theme, the kōmos, a ritualistic drunken procession performed by revelers in ancient Greece, whose participants were known as komasts (κωμασταί, kōmastaí). This is a motif closely connected with Etruscan vase painting.

The typical hemispherical shape with an angled "offset" lip and a low foot of only 1–2 centimetres (0.4–0.8 in) height was an Attic development. The interior of the cups is black, only a narrow stripe or band below the lip is left in the base clay colour. The foot and the exterior of the handles are also black. The first specimens were quite large, but throughout the period of their production, the cups became gradually smaller. The most important painters of Komast cups formed the so-called Comast Group, with the KX Painter as its most significant member.

== Bibliography ==
- Thomas Mannack: Griechische Vasenmalerei. Eine Einführung, Theiss, Stuttgart 2002, p. 108f. ISBN 3-8062-1743-2.
