= Skyphos =

Ancient Greek vase shape; drinking cup

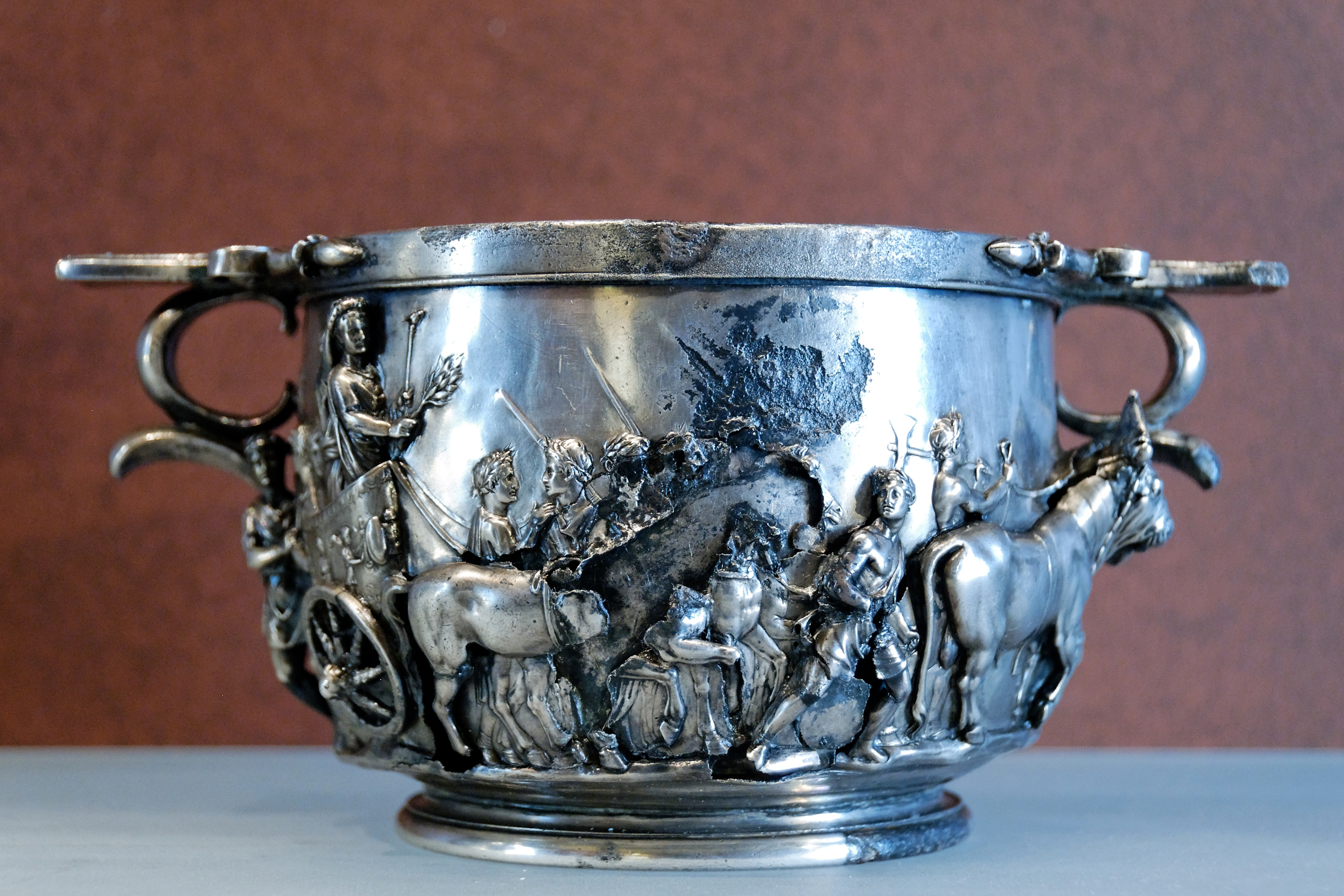
- Emperor Tiberius's triumph. Silver skyphos with repoussé decoration, late 1st century BC–early 1st century AD. From the villa della Pisanella at Boscoreale, 1895. Below: Attic skyphos depicting a hoplite, c. 490–480 BC

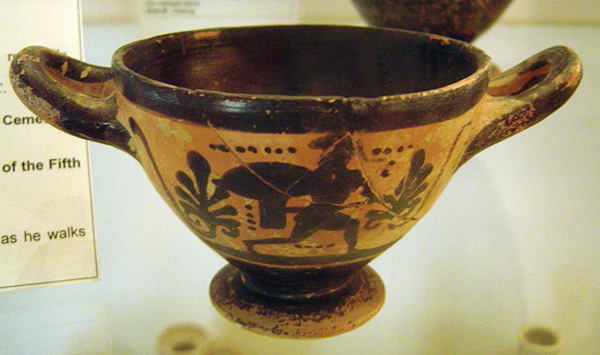
- Material: Ceramic, glass, precious metals
- Created: Multiple cultures, originating predominantly in Greece and exported.
- Period/culture: A vaseform of the Iron Age
- Place: Circum-Mediterranean

A skyphos (Ancient Greek: σκύφος; pl.: skyphoi) is a two-handled deep wine-cup on a low flanged base or none. The handles may be horizontal ear-shaped thumbholds that project from the rim (in both Corinthian and Athenian shapes), or they may be loop handles at the rim or that stand away from the lower part of the body. Skyphoi of the type called glaux (owl) have one horizontal and one vertical thumbhold handle.

== Examples ==
Early skyphoi were made during the Geometric period. Corinth set the conventions that Athens followed. Over a long period the shape remained the same while the style of decoration changed.

Skyphoi were also made of precious metals, generally silver and gold leaf, many examples exist. One possible, well-preserved example is the Warren Cup, (Note: In his notes, John Pollini states that uncertainty about the correct name of many ancient drinking vessels exists, however he refers to the object with the "established classificatory term scyphus", Specifically "half-oval variety of scyphus of the calix type". He cites as the "principal work" for such classifacation as: Werner Hilgers, Lateinische Gefassnamen: Bezeichnungen, Funktion und Form romischer Gefasse nach den antiken Schriftquellen, Beiheft der Bonner Jahrbucher, vol. 31 (Dusseldorf: Rheinland-Verlag, 1969). More recently: Stefanelli, 119-24, figs. 84–86.) an ovoid scyphus made of silver, as described by John Pollini. A Roman skyphos of cameo glass can be seen at the Getty Museum.

Comparable forms of a handled drinking cup on a base included:

- Cotyla, a more generic term for any cup
- Kantharos
- Komast cup
- Kylix

== Modern uses ==
The word skyphos has been adopted for the purposes of biological classification with regard to jellyfish, which are included in the class Scyphozoa (lit. 'cup-shaped animal'), and Sarcoscypha, the scarlet cup fungus.

== See also ==
- Black-figure pottery
- Red-figure pottery
- Boscoreale Treasure
- Geometric art
