= Komos =

Ancient Greek drunken ritual procession

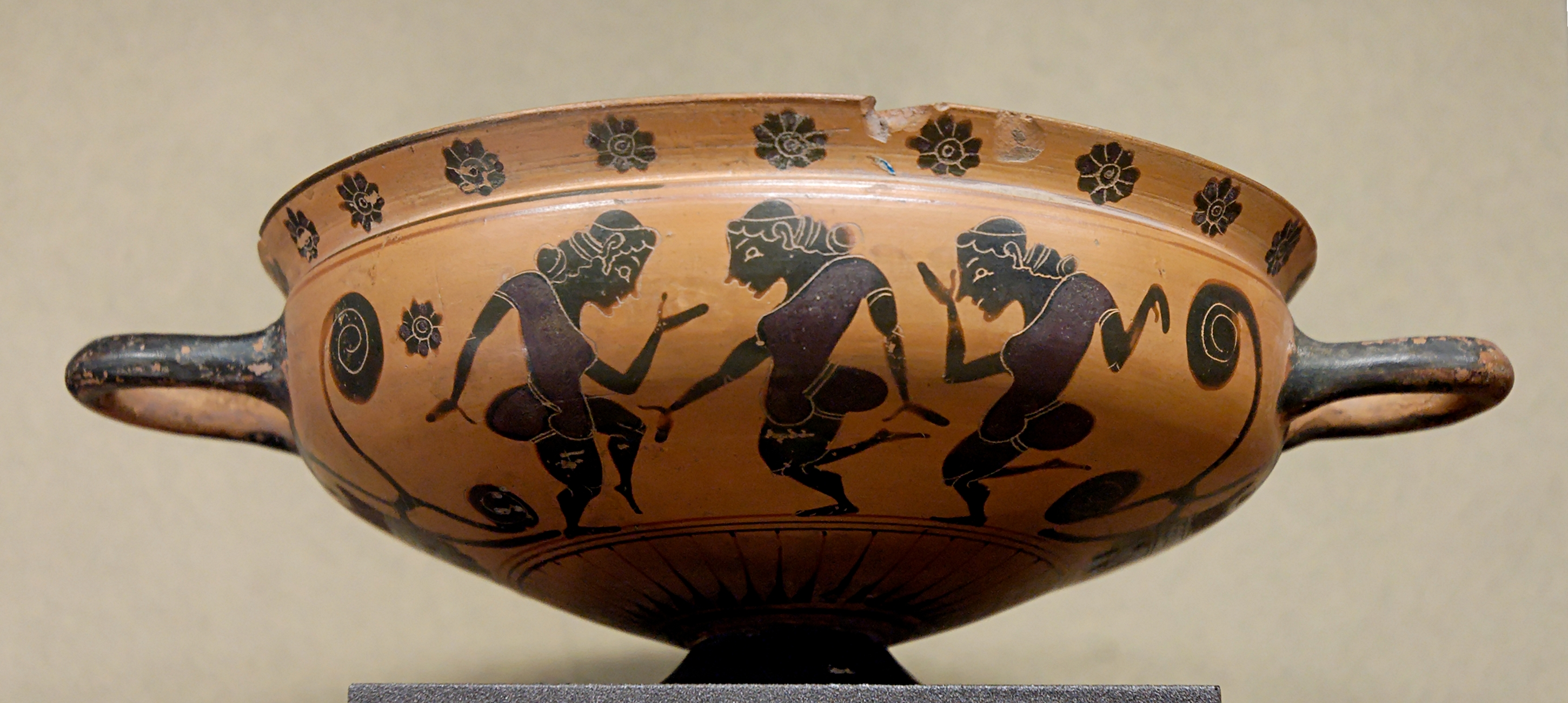
kōmos revellry scene from a Komast cup by the KY Painter, c. 575 BC, Louvre (E 742)

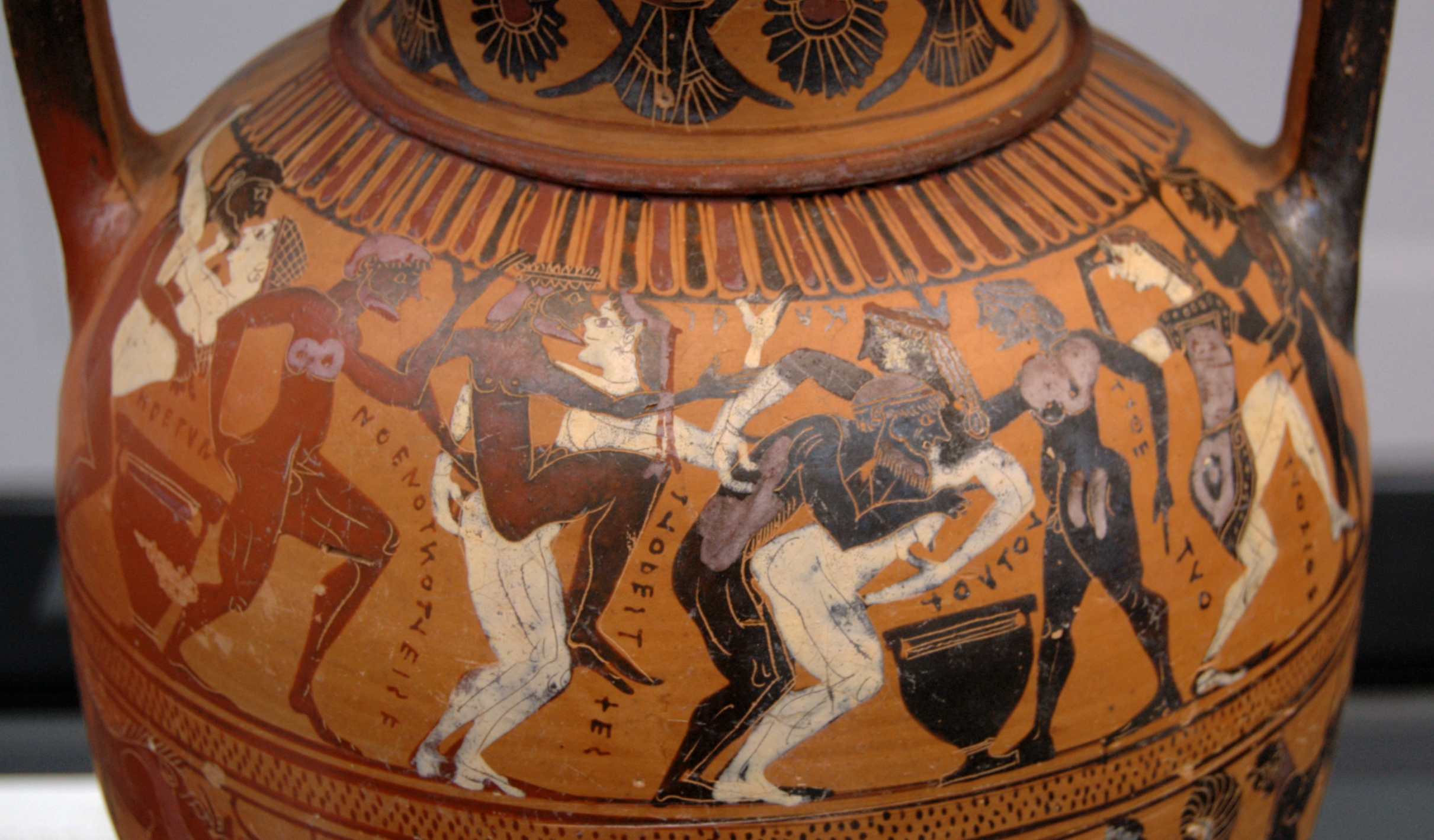
kōmos scene, black-figure amphora by member of the Tyrrhenian group, c. 560 BC, Staatliche Antikensammlungen (Inv. 1432)

The kōmos (Ancient Greek: κῶμος; pl.: kōmoi) was a ritualistic drunken procession performed by revelers in ancient Greece, whose participants were known as kōmasts (κωμασταί, kōmastaí). Its precise nature has been difficult to reconstruct from the diverse literary sources and evidence derived from vase painting.

The earliest reference to the kōmos is in Hesiod's Shield of Herakles, which indicates it took place as part of wedding festivities (line 281). And famously Alcibiades gate-crashes the Symposium while carousing in a kōmos. However, no one kind of event is associated with the kōmos: Pindar describes them taking place at the city festivals (Pythian 5.21, 8.20, Olympian 4.9), while Demosthenes mentions them taking place after the pompe and choregoi on the first day of the Greater Dionysia (Speeches 21.10), which may indicate the kōmos might have been a competitive event.

The kōmos must be distinguished from the pompe, or ritual procession, and the chorus, both of which were scripted. The kōmos lacked a chorus leader, script, or rehearsal. In the performance of Greek victory odes (epinikia) at post-Game celebrations for winning athletes, the choral singers often present themselves as kōmasts, or extend an invitation to join the kōmos, as if the formal song were a preliminary to spontaneous revelry. Nevertheless, some kōmoi were expressly described as semnoí ('modest', 'decent'), which implies that standard kōmoi were anything but.

Demosthenes upbraids the brother-in-law of Aeschines for not wearing a mask during the komos, as was the custom (On the Embassy 19.287), suggesting costume or disguise may have been involved. The playing of music during the kōmos is also mentioned by Aristophanes (Thesmophoriazusae 104, 988) and Pindar (Olympian 4.9, Pythian 5.22). There are also depictions of torch-lit processions in vase painting, yet it is not always clear from the evidence of vases if they depict symposia, choruses or kōmoi.

It is now widely thought that kōmos and κωμῳδία – komoidia, "comedy", are etymologically related, the derivation being kōmos + ᾠδή - o(i)de, "song" (from ἀείδω – aeido, "sing"). However, in part III of the Poetics, Aristotle records the tradition that the word kōmoedia derives from the Megaran mime that took place in the villages of Sicily, hence from κώμη – kōme 'village'. Nevertheless, it remains unclear exactly how the revel-song developed into the Greek Old comedy of the Dionysian festival in the 6th century BC.

== See also ==
- Corpus vasorum antiquorum
