= Laconian vase painting =

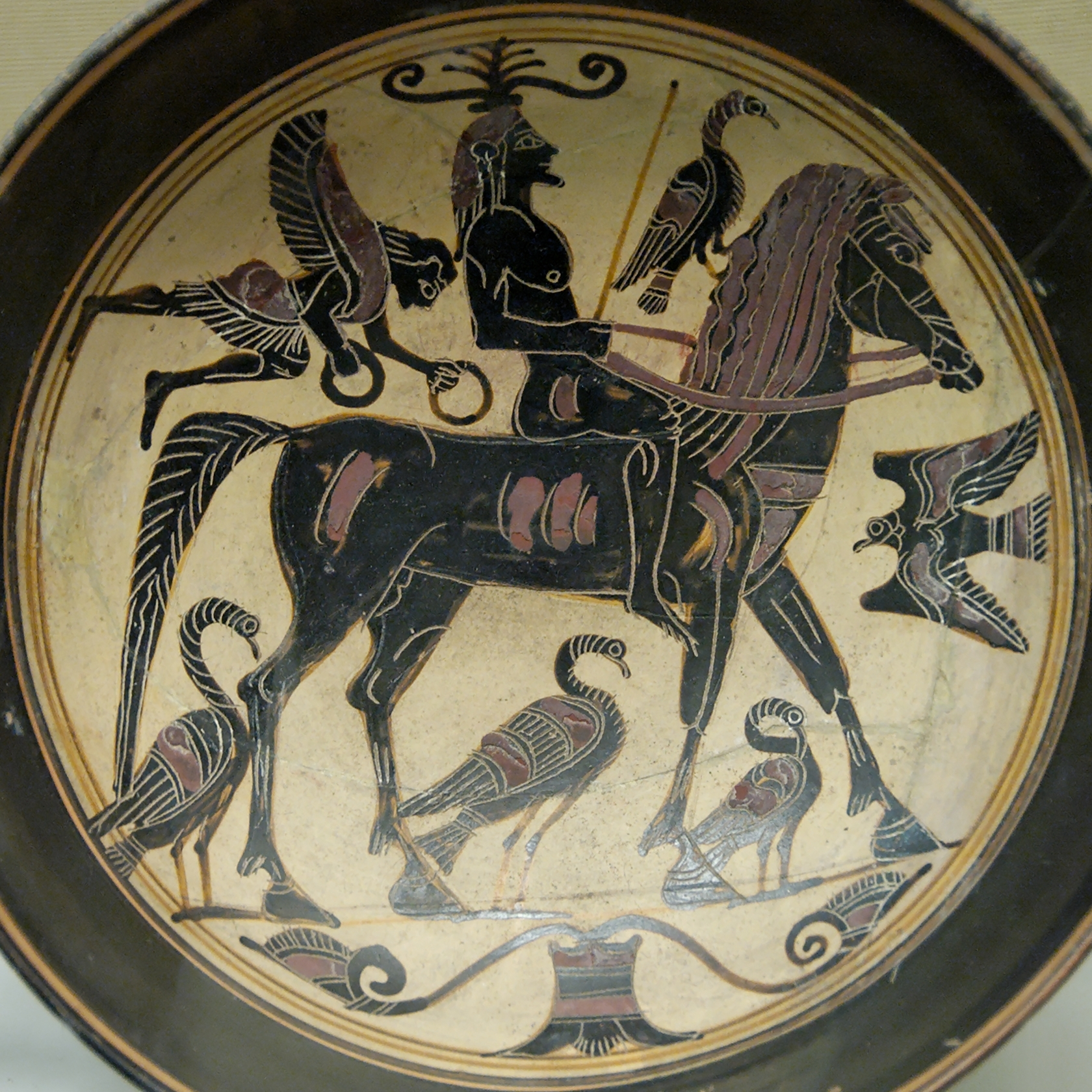
Name vase of the Rider Painter, cup, circa 550/530 BC. London: British Museum.

Laconian vase painting is a regional style of Greek vase painting, produced in Laconia, the region of Sparta, primarily in the 6th century BC.

The first pottery with ornamental decoration produced in Laconia belongs to the Geometric period.

== Black-figure ==
Laconian pottery was discovered in considerable amounts in the 19th century, mostly in Etruscan graves. Initially, it was falsely interpreted as produce of Cyrene, where similar material had been found. Thanks to British excavations undertaken since 1906 in the sanctuary of Artemis Orthia at Sparta, the real origin was later recognised. In 1934, Edward Arthur Lane collated the known finds, and became the first archaeologist to distinguish several individual Laconian painters. In 1954, Brian B. Shefton examined new finds. He reduced the number of painters assumed until then by half. The remainder were the Arkesilas Painter, the Hunt Painter and the Rider Painter. In 1958 and 1959, important new finds from Taras were published. Additionally, a significant number of Laconian vases were discovered on Samos. Conrad Michael Stibbe re-examined all available material and published his results in 1972. He distinguished five major and three minor vase painters, adding to the three painters mentioned above the Boreades Painter, the Naukratis Painter, the Allard-Pierson Painter, the Typhon painter and the Chimeira Painter. Other scholars have recognised further artists, such as the Painter of the Taranto Fishes or the Grammichele Painter.

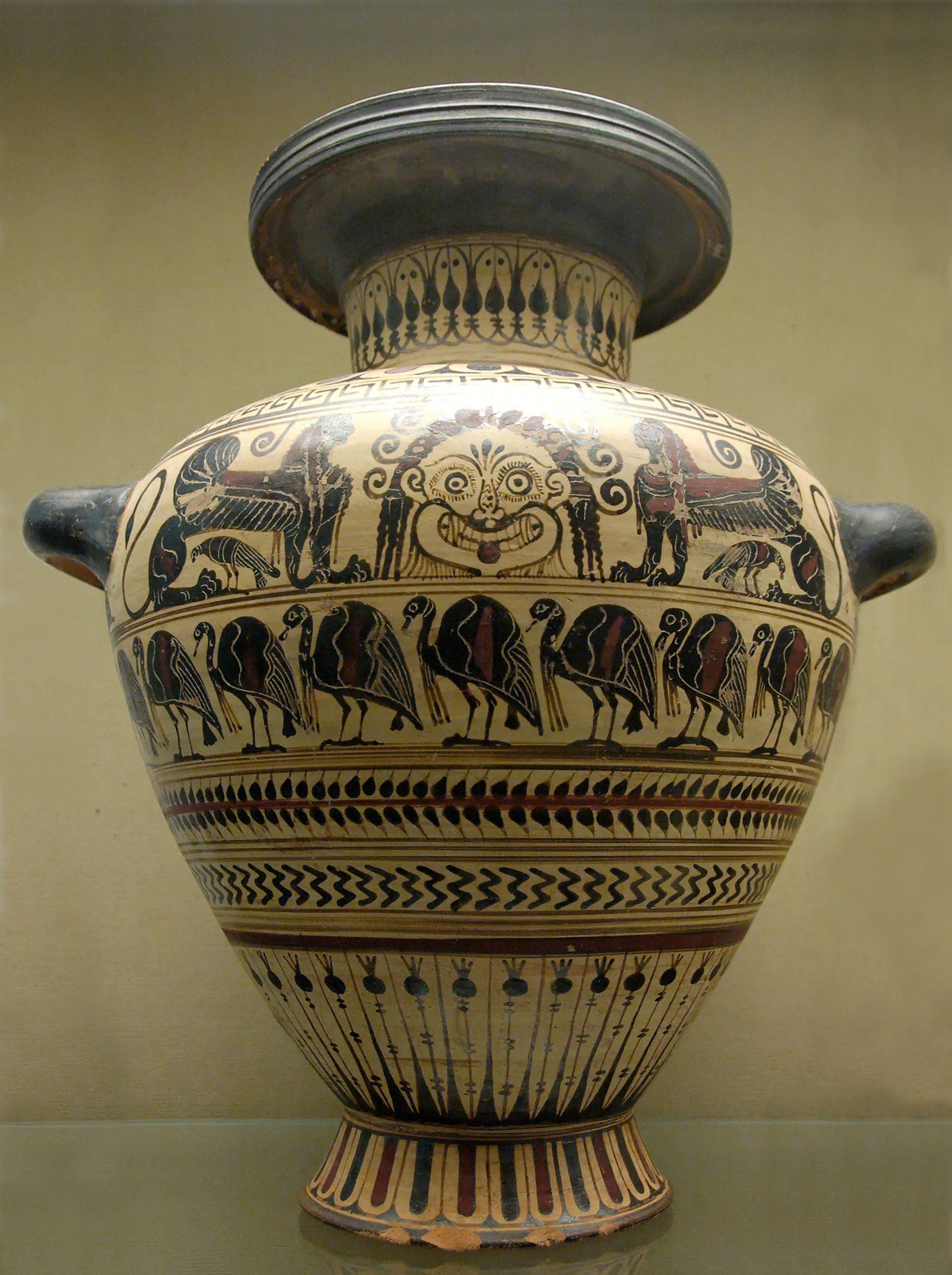
Amphora in the style of the Hunt Painter, with gorgoneion, cranes and sphinxes, circa 540/530 BC. London: British Museum.

The clay of Laconian vases is orange, quite refined and of high quality. The vessels were wholly or partially covered with a yellowish-white slip. The first vases of notable quality were made around 580 BC. The leading shape of Laconian pottery is the kylix. Rim and bowl were initially sharply distinguished, but by the middle of the century, the transition was smoother. The earliest cups had no foot, later, a short squat foot was added. In the next phase, around 570 BC, it became higher, only to turn shorter and squatter again near the end of the productive period. Laconian vases were quite widely distributed: specimens have been found at Marseille, Taranto, Reggio di Calabria, Cumae, Nola, Naukratis, Sardes, Rhodes, Samos, Etruria and nearly all over the Greek mainland. On Samos they were at times more common than imports from Corinth, presumably because of the close political links between Sparta and Samos. Apart from cups, amphorae, hydriai, Laconian kraters, volute kraters, lebetes, lakaina and aryballoi were produced.

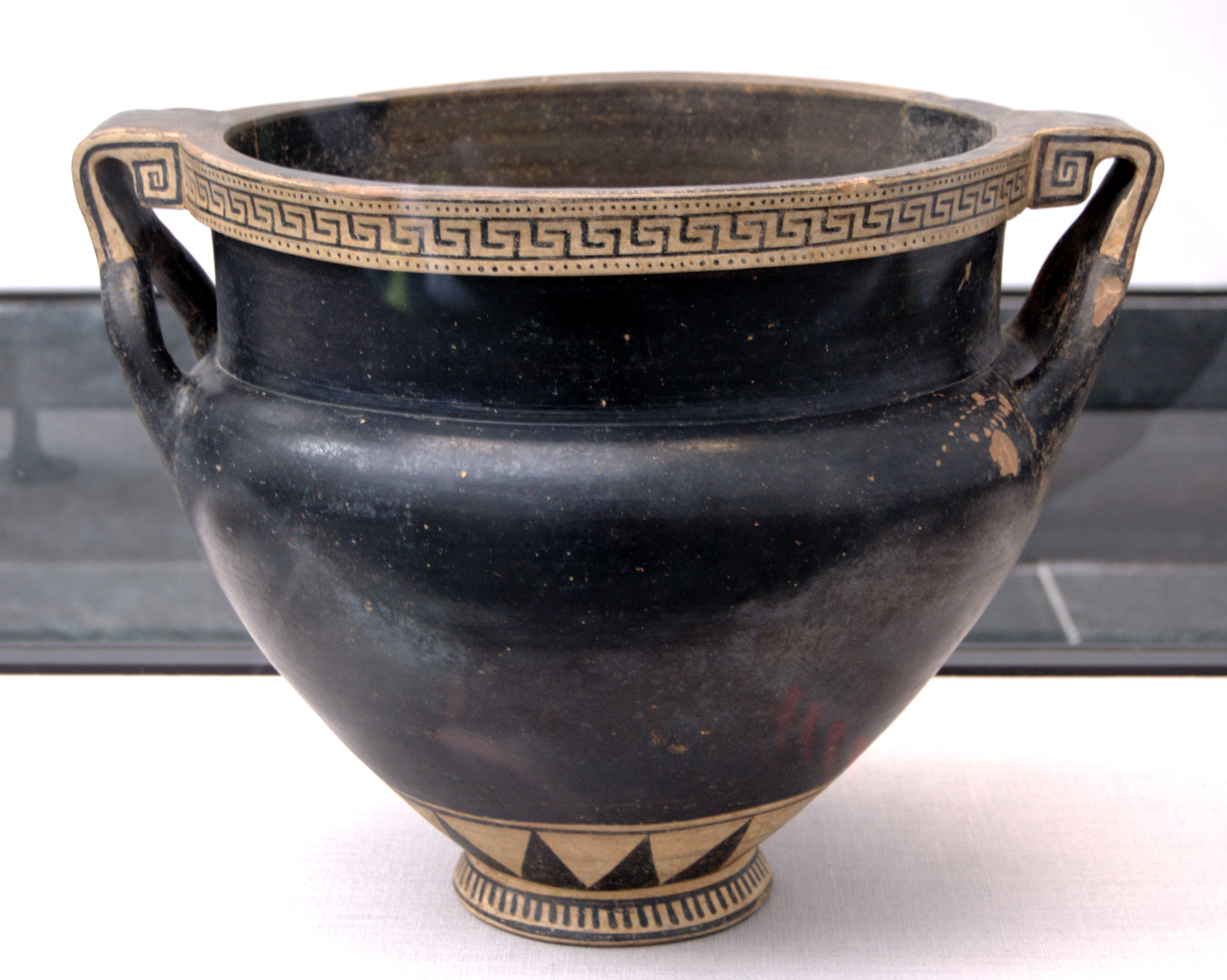
Laconian krater without figural paintings, first half 6th century BC, Munich: Staatliche Antikensammlungen.

It is likely that Laconian pottery was produced by perioikoi but this is nor certain. Although we know of Spartan citizen families being involved in craft activities of direct importance to warfare, it is unlikely that pottery production was considered among those. Helots worked exclusively in agriculture. Another theory proposes that the potters was made by itinerant potters from East Greece. This would be suggested by the strong East Greek influence on the paintings, especially those by the Boreades Painter. Production was aimed at the local market, and to some export. Cups were mostly made for export, the typical Spartan drinking vessel lakaina was mainly found in Laconia. The work of some of the painters has not so far been found in Laconia at all, indicating that some workshops entirely concentrated on export. It can be assumed that the producers were potter-painters, i.e. that both stages of production were performed by the same individuals, as certain specific features in the vase shapes are only found on works ascribed to a single painter. No workshops have so far been located; perhaps they were in peroikic settlements not yet excavated. Neither potters nor painters signed their vases. In fact, inscriptions are quite rare and only ever used to name painted figures.

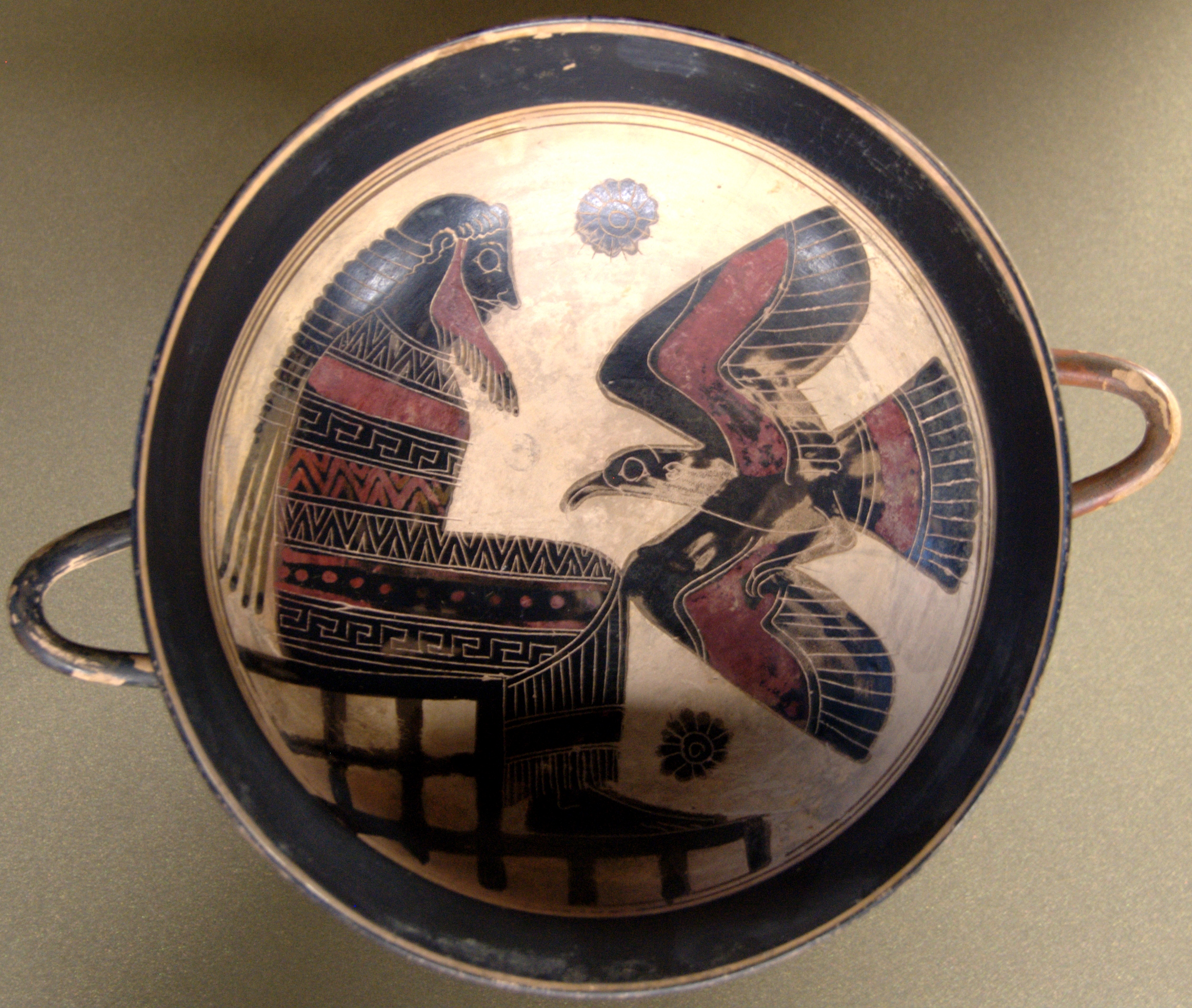
Zeus and eagle on a cup by the Rider Painter, circa 560 BC; Paris: Louvre.

The painters used additional colours, such as red and white, quite extensively, but also very carefully, thereby increasing the decorative effect. Earlier than other local styles, e.g. those of Corinth, Attica or East Greece, the figurally decorated interior of the cup became the carrier of the main image. Around 570 BC, perhaps under the influence of East Greek plates, the Boreades Painter subdivided the interior image into segments. Such zones were to become typical of Laconian vase painting. He also introduced the typical Laconian tripartite subdivision of the exterior surface of the cup bowl (pomegranates, flames and rays). The painters depicted scenes of everyday life, hunting scenes, symposia and motifs related to warfare. Additionally, mythological imagery was common. Among it, the most popular figure was Herakles, usually shown in combat with animals or monsters. Other motifs include Troilos and Achilles, Atlas, the hunt for the Calydonian boar, the return of Hephaistos to Mount Olympus, Prometheus and the blinding of Polyphemus. The most frequently depicted gods are Zeus and Poseidon. The interior image can also be of a gorgon. Images connected to the Trojan and Theban cycles of myth are also common. Special Laconian features are, for example, a horseman with a volute tendril growing from his head, or an image of the nymph Kyrene. Some vases were merely covered in shiny slip, or painted with only few ornaments.

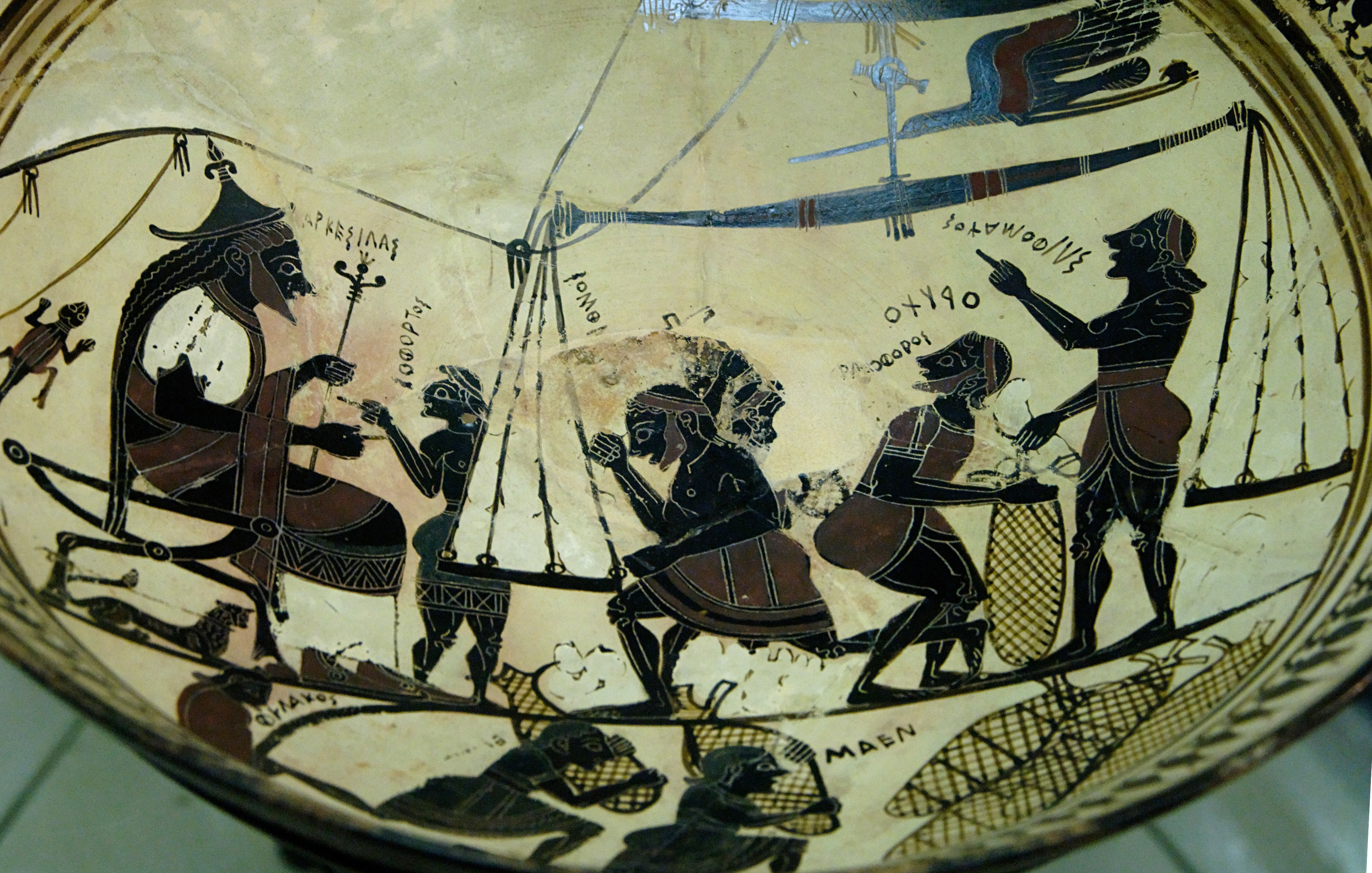
Cup by the Arkesilas Painter, showing Arkesilaos II overseeing his subjects loading or unloading a ship, circa 565/560 BC. Paris: Cabinet des Médailles.

The chronology developed by scholars primarily relies on finds from Taras and Tokra. The floruit of Laconian vase painting is usually placed in the period between 575 and 525 BC. Another important piece of chronological evidence is provided by the depiction of Arkesilaos II on the Arkesilas Cup, the name vase of the Arkesilas Painter. It was probably produced during that king's reign. The usually very high-quality products of Laconian vase painting are among the most significant Greek vases.

== Red-figure ==
There are around eighty-one vases or fragments of Laconian red-figure vase painting, produced from c.430 for thirty to forty years. The majority of examples were found by Konstantinos Rhomaios at a Laconian settlement at Analipsis hill near Vourvoura during surface survey in 1899–1900, and then in excavations in the undertaken in early 1950s. The rest of the known Laconian red-figure examples are from Sparta, and the Tomb of the Laconians in the Athenian Kerameikos. Notable examples of the technique include what might be a depiction of a Karneia dancer from the Tomb of the Laconians in Athenian Kerameikos. Other scenes depicted include local mythology and ritual, such as the birth of Helen, Herakles, Athena, Thetis with the arms of Achilles, and Dionysian scenes and a Papsilenos, as well as youthful athletics and battle scenes. The Laconian pottery from the settlement at Analipsis hill was associated with offerings for domestic cult, and in the case of a fragment showing Dionysos and two maenads, as offerings found near the altar of a Classical building interpreted as a local sanctuary.

== Bibliography ==
- John Boardman: Early Greek Vase Painting, Thames and Hudson, London 1998 . 11th to 6th Century BC. A Handbook, Thames and Hudson, London 1998 (World of Art), p. 185–188 ISBN 0-500-20309-1
- Thomas Mannack: Griechische Vasenmalerei. Eine Einführung. Theiss, Stuttgart 2002, pp. 125–128 ISBN 3-8062-1743-2.
- Gerald P. Schaus: Geometrische Vasenmalerei, In: Der Neue Pauly Vol. 4 (1998), col. 935–938
- Matthias Steinhart: Lakonische Vasenmalerei, In: Der Neue Pauly, cols. 1074/1075
- Conrad M. Stibbe: Lakonische Vasenmaler des sechsten Jahrhunderts v. Chr. [2 Vols], North-Holland Publishing Company, Amsterdam-London 1972
- Conrad M. Stibbe: Lakonische Vasenmaler des sechsten Jahrhunderts v. Chr. Supplement, von Zabern, Mainz 2004 ISBN 3-8053-3279-3
- Conrad M. Stibbe: Das andere Sparta, von Zabern, Mainz 2004 (Kulturgeschichte der antiken Welt Vol. 65), p. 163-203 ISBN 3-8053-1804-9
- Rhomaios, Konstantinos (1955). "Ανασκαφαί κατά την Ανάληψην". Praktika: 241–242.
- Rhomaios, Konstantinos (1954). "Ανασκαφική έρευνα κατά τηνΑνάληψην". Praktika: 270–286.
- Rhomaios, Konstantinos (1950). "Ερευνητική περιοδεία εις Κυνουρίαν". Praktika: 234–241.
- Mcphee, Ian (1986). "Laconian Red-Figure from the British Excavations in Sparta". The Annual of the British School at Athens. 81: 153–166. doi:10.1017/S0068245400020128. JSTOR 30102895. S2CID 164018692.
- Stroszeck, J. (2006). "Lakonisch-rotfigurige Keramik aus den Lakedaimoniergräbern am Kerameikos von Athen (403 v. Chr.)". Archäologischer Anzeiger. 2: 101–120.
- Stroszeck, J. (2014). "Laconian Red-Figure Pottery: Local Production and Use". In Schierup, Stine; Sabetai, Victoria (eds.). The Regional Production of Red-Figure Pottery: Greece, Magna Graecia and Etruria. Aarhus Universitetsforlag. pp. 137–156. ISBN 978-87-7124-393-2.
- Lane, E. A. (November 1934). "Lakonian Vase-Painting". The Annual of the British School at Athens. 34: 99–189. doi:10.1017/S006824540000719X. JSTOR 30096630. S2CID 191394678.
- Shefton, B. B. (1954). "Three Laconian Vase-Painters". The Annual of the British School at Athens. 49: 299–310. doi:10.1017/S0068245400012806. JSTOR 30096999. S2CID 193130370.
