= Arkesilas Painter =

Ancient Greek vase painter

The Arkesilas Painter was a Laconian vase painter active around 560 BC. He is considered one of the five great vase painters of Sparta.

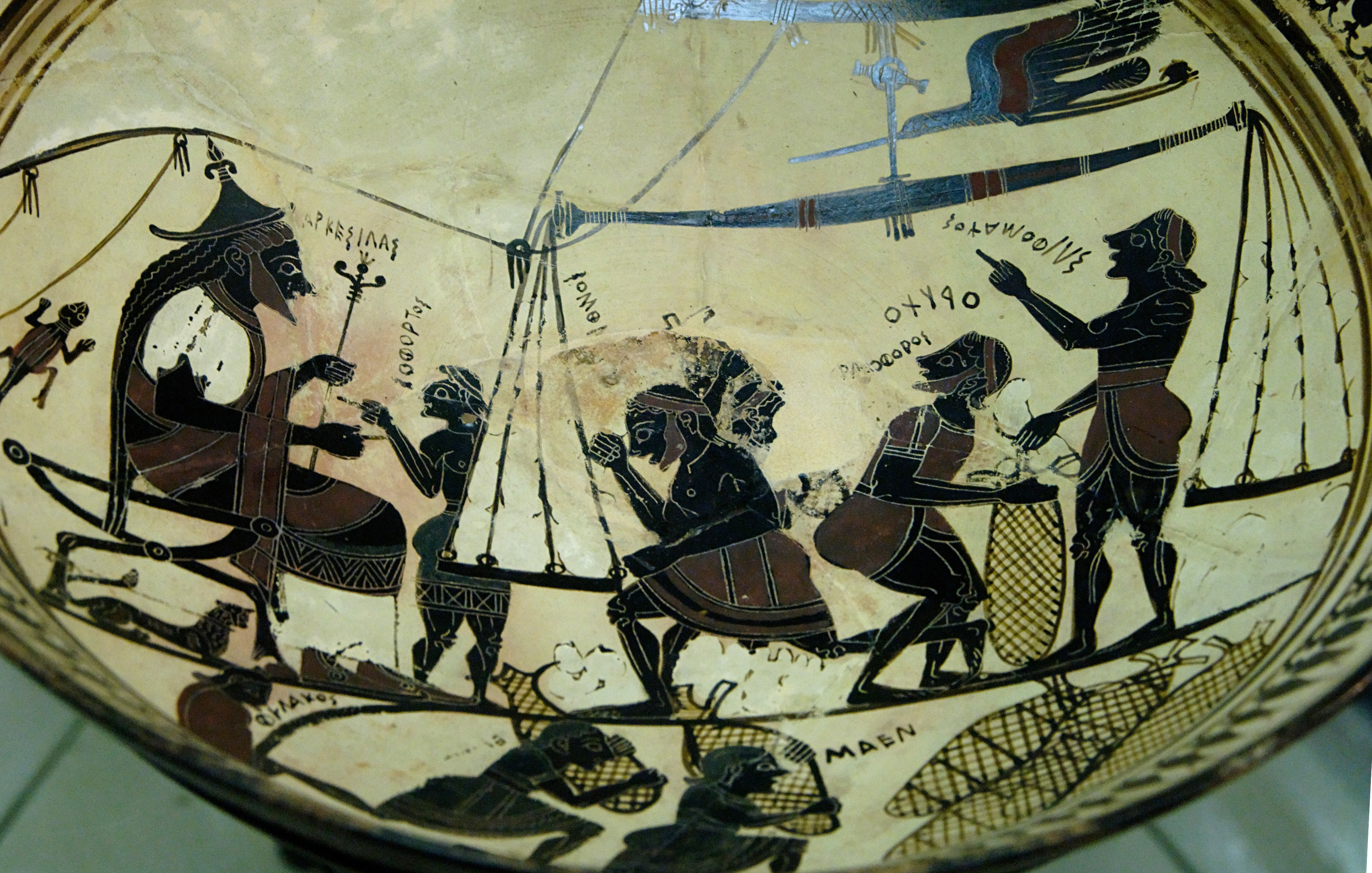
The Arkesilas Cup, name vase of the Arkesilas Painter, circa 565/560 BC; Paris: Cabinet des Médailles.

His conventional name is derived from his name vase, the so-called Arkesilas Cup, a kylix now on display at the Cabinet des médailles of the Bibliothèque nationale de France. The vessel, found at Vulci, depicts Arkesilaos II, King of Cyrene, watching his subjects packing and weighing trade goods. It is a singular motif in ancient Greek art, and one of very few vase painting depicting recognisable historical figures. Along with a further painting by the artist which depicts the nymph Kyrene wrestling a lion, it led to the original suggestion that the artist was active in North Africa, but later excavations in Laconia proved that notion to be false.

Another of his vases depicts women, their skin indicated by white paint. This technique, typical of Corinthian and Attic vase painting, is not otherwise known from Laconian workshops. A similar image shows Herakles, apparently fighting two amazons. Their faces are white, their legs not visible.

The Arkesilas Painter primarily painted cups. He mainly painted symposion scenes and images from Greek mythology. The latter are dominated by depictions of Herakles, the amazons, Atlas and Prometheus. The latter two figures occur together on a single vase. Apart from figural painting, he also ascribed vases bearing merely ornamental decoration. His drawing style is precise and lively. He was identified, as one of the first known Laconian vase painters, in 1934, by Edward Arthur Lane. His early work was originally falsely attributed to the then so-called "Hephaistos Painter", now known as the Boreades Painter de.

== Bibliography ==
- John Boardman: Early Greek Vase Painting. Thames and Hudson, London 1998 . 11th to 6th Century BC. A Handbook, Thames and Hudson, London 1998 (World of Art), pp. 185–188, ISBN 0-500-20309-1.
- Thomas Mannack: Griechische Vasenmalerei. Eine Einführung. Theiss, Stuttgart 2002, pp. 125–128, ISBN 3-8062-1743-2.
- Matthis Steinhart: Arkesilas-Maler, In: Der Neue Pauly, V.2., p. 8.
- Conrad M. Stibbe: Das andere Sparta. von Zabern, Mainz 1996 (Kulturgeschichte der Antiken Welt, Vol. 65), pp. 163–203, ISBN 3-8053-1804-9.
