= Class of Cabinet des Médailles 218 =

Attic black-figure vase painters and type of vase they produced

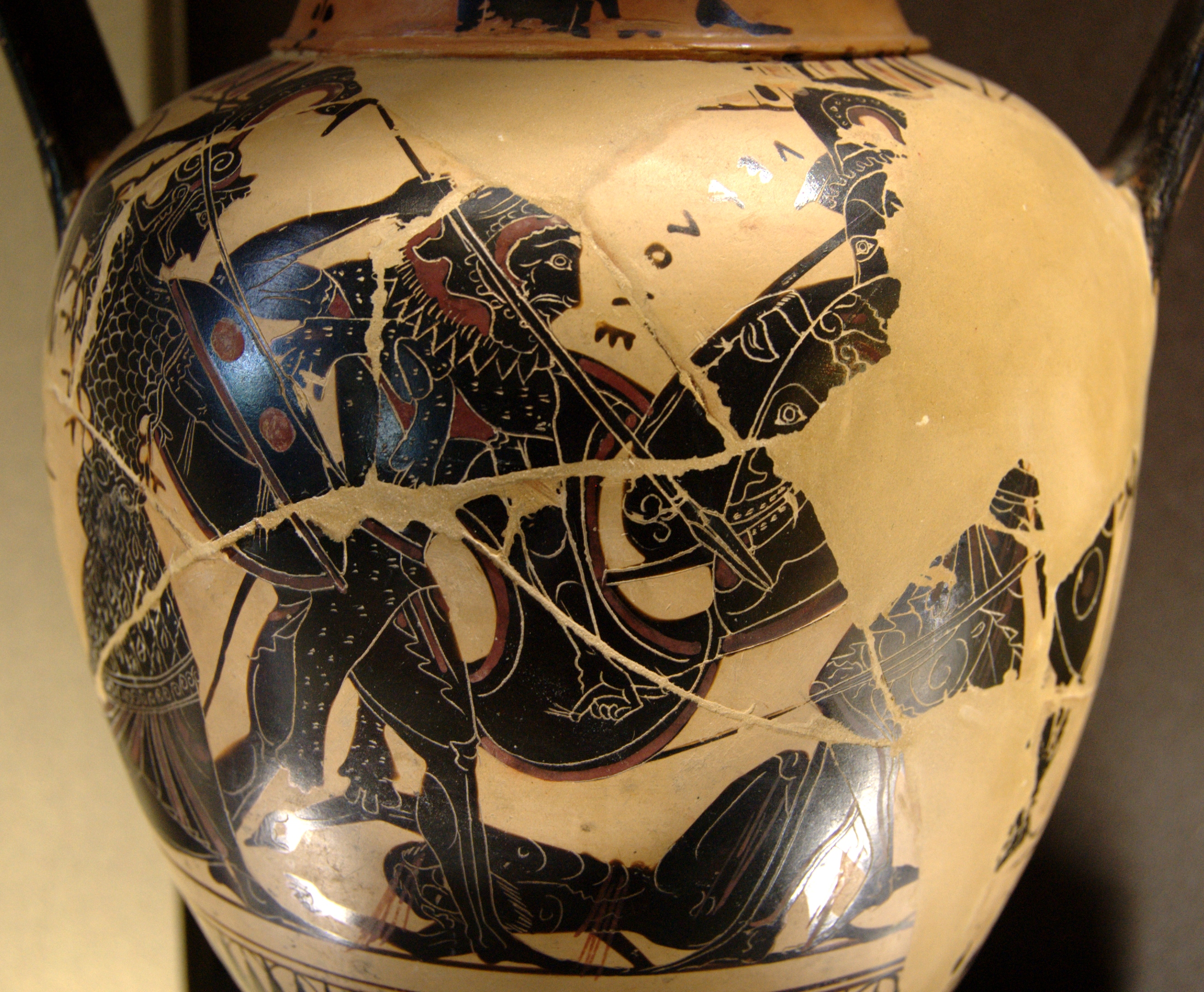
Herakles fighting Geryon. c. 520/510 BC. Louvre.

The term Class of Cabinet des Médailles 218, or Class of Cab. Méd. 218 or Class of C.M. 218 describes both a group of Attic black-figure vase painters, and a type of vase they produced. They belong to the final third of the sixth century BC.

The class painted variants of the Nikosthenic amphora. The vases' profiles are more flowing and less angular than the more common styles, making them more Greek in character. Two of the vases were produced by the potter Pamphaios and painted by Oltos. Like all Nikosthenic amphorae, works of the Class of Cabinet des Médailles 218 were found exclusively at Caere. This indicates that following the tradition of Nikosthenes, they produced exclusively for export to Etruria. The group's conventional name is derived from its name vase, inventory 218 at the Cabinet des Médailles of the Bibliothèque Nationale de France in Paris.

== Bibliography ==
- John Beazley: Attic Black-Figure Vase-Painters, Oxford 1956, p. 319-320
- John Beazley: Paralipomena. Additions to Attic black-figure vase-painters and to Attic red-figure vase-painters. Oxford 1971. p.
- John Boardman: Schwarzfigurige Vasen aus Athen. Ein Handbuch, Mainz 1977, ISBN 3-8053-0233-9, p. 122
- Media related to Class of Cabinet des Médailles 218 at Wikimedia Commons
