= Arthur Lane =

Arthur Lane may refer to:

- Arthur Bliss Lane (1894–1956), United States Ambassador to Poland, 1944–1947
- Arthur Lane (actor) (1910–1987), British actor
- Arthur Stephen Lane (1910–1997), United States federal judge
- Edward Arthur Lane (1909 –1963), British art historian who published under the names Arthur Lane and E.A. Lane
