= Arkesilas Cup =

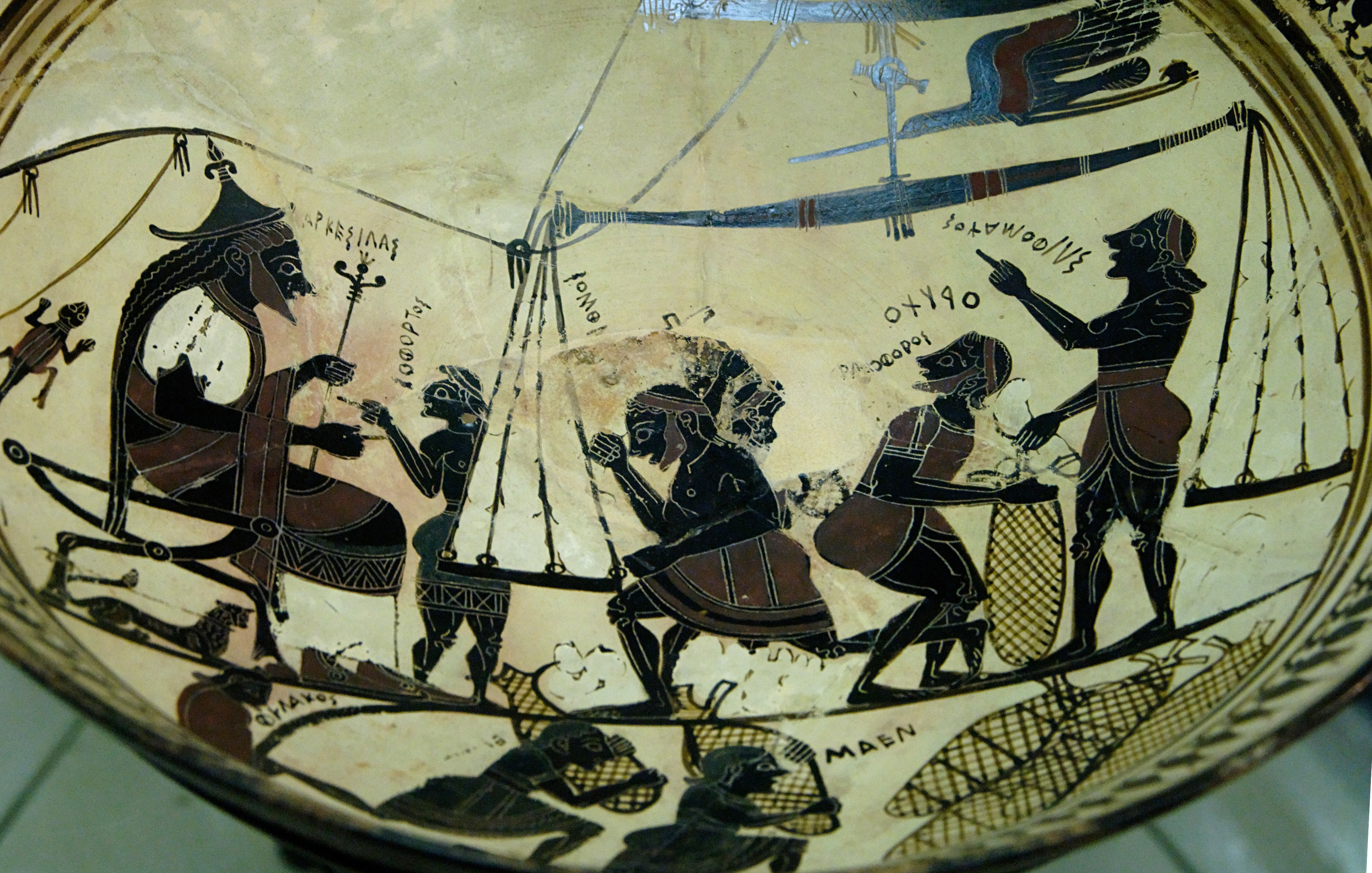
- Created: c. 563 BC by the Arkesilas Painter
- Discovered: before 1999; Montalto di Castro, Lazio, Italy
- Present location: Paris, Ile-de-France, France

The Arkesilas Cup is a kylix by the Laconian vase painter known as the Arkesilas Painter, whose name vase it is. It depicts, and is thus named after, Arkesilaos II, king of Kyrene (d. 550 BC) and is dated to about 565–560 BC.

The cup was found at Vulci and is now on display in the Cabinet des médailles of the Bibliothèque nationale de France in Paris (inv. 189). It depicts Arkesilaos seated under a tent-like sheet and wearing an African hat. Because of this dress style and another vase depicting the nymph Kyrene wrestling a lion, the Arkesilas Painter was initially assumed to have been active in North Africa. Later finds indicate that he was Laconian. The king is watching seven men who are packing, weighing and stacking trade goods. Added inscriptions specify their activities and the king's name. It is not clear what products or products they are loading. Some scholars suggest it is silphion, a rare plant for which Arkesilaos had a trade monopoly. His watchful stance mays support this. Several African animals underline the African location of the image.

In style and subject the painting is very unusual in Greek vase-painting. The depiction of a living political figure is extremely rare and unusual in vase painting, and images of Arekisalos II are similarly rare. For technological history, the depiction of weighing scales is of major significance, as their structure and use is shown. Historically, the production of such imagery in Laconia is also important, in that it illustrates the close links between Sparta and North Africa. Another vase by the same painter, depicting the nymph Kyrene, patron of the city of Kyrene, in North Africa, was found on the island of Samos, also a close ally of Sparta.

== Bibliography ==
- John Boardman: Early Greek Vase Painting. 11th to 6th Century BC. A Handbook. Thames and Hudson, London 1998 (World of Art), p. 185–188, ISBN 0-500-20309-1.
- Thomas Mannack: Griechische Vasenmalerei. Eine Einführung. Theiss, Stuttgart 2002, pp. 125–128, ISBN 3-8062-1743-2.
- Barbara Patzek: Arkesilaos II, In Der Neue Pauly
- Matthias Steinhart: Arkesilas-Maler, In: Der Neue Pauly
