= Rider Painter =

Laconian vase painter

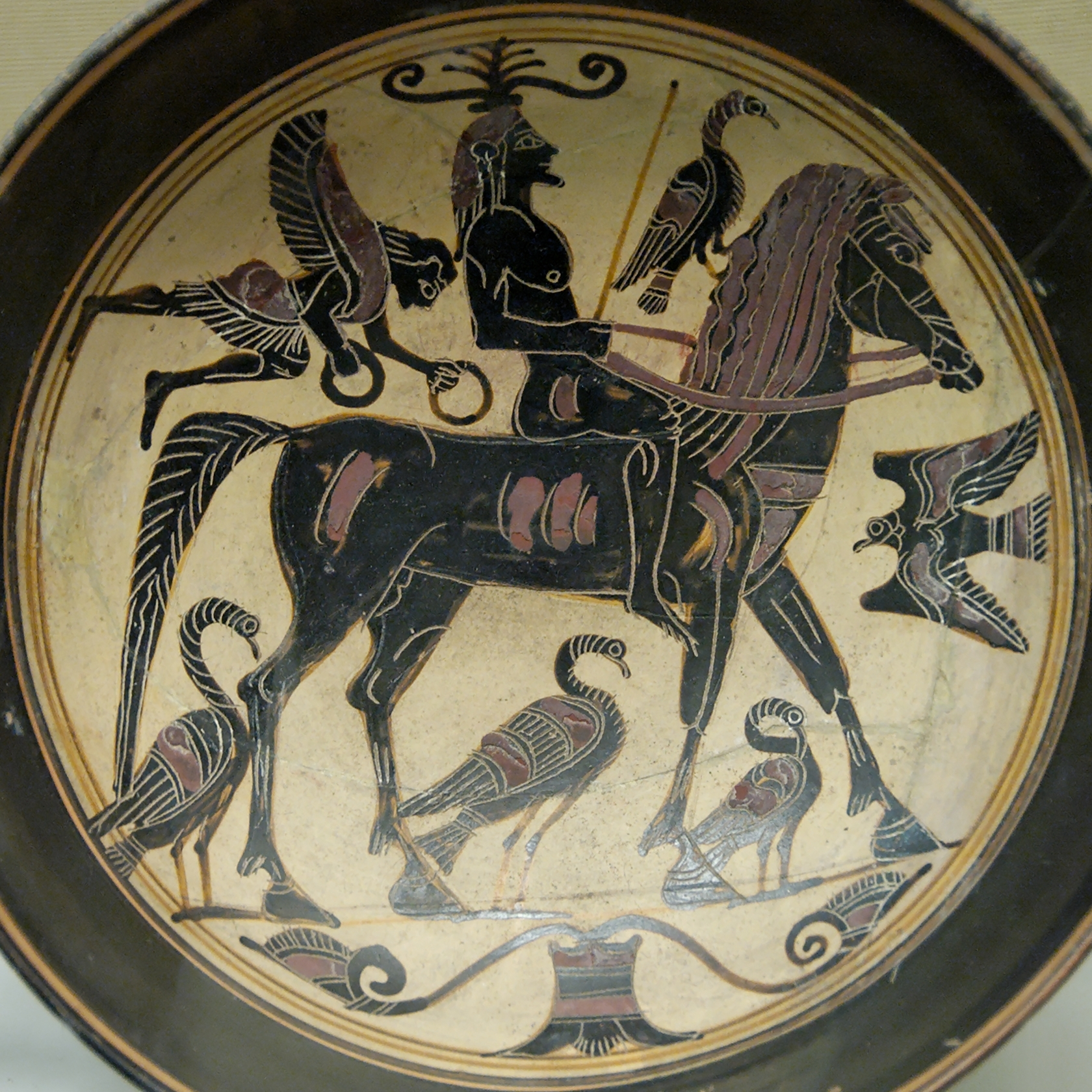
Name vase of the Rider Painter. Horseman accompanied by a winged figure (Nike?). Cup, circa 550–520 BC, London: British Museum.

The Rider Painter was a Laconian vase painter active between 560 and 530 BC. He is considered one of the five great vase painters of Sparta.

His name is unknown, but he is called the Rider Painter after the horseman depicted on his name vase at the British Museum. He painted various shapes, including lebetes, a rare shape in Sparta, but predominantly kylikes. He primarily produced for export, as indicated by the fact that one of his works has so far been discovered in Laconia. His workshop cannot be located, but was perhaps in a perioikic settlement. Since identifiable painting styles and peculiarities in vase shapes tend to be consistent, it is assumed that the Rider Painter, like other Laconian vase painters, was both potter and painter. He is considered somewhat inferior in talent to the other four great Laconian vase painters. He mainly depicted scenes from Greek mythology, such as the blinding of Polyphemus, Kadmos or Herakles. Other motifs include scenes from everyday life, such komasts or the eponymous rider.

== Bibliography ==
- John Boardman: Early Greek Vase Painting. 11th to 6th Century BC. A Handbook, Thames and Hudson, London 1998 (World of Art), 188 ISBN 0-500-20309-1
- Thomas Mannack: Griechische Vasenmalerei. Eine Einführung. Theiss, Stuttgart 2002, p. 126 ISBN 3-8062-1743-2.
