= Rascas de Bagarris =

Pierre-Antoine Rascas, sieur de Bagarris et du Bourguet (15 February 1569 – 14 April 1620), was an advocate at the Parlement of Aix-en-Provence, and a founder of the science of historical numismatics. de Bagarris was one of the most notable antiquaries of his time.

== Biography ==
Rascas was born and died in Aix-en-Provence. Henri IV recognized his value, and placed him in charge of the royal collection of medals and antiquities kept at Fontainebleau, which formed one of the nuclei of the royal Cabinet des Médailles, now a department of the Bibliothèque nationale de France. Rascas de Bagarris, as he is known, augmented the royal collection from his own. He had the idea of assembling a collection of antique coins that would form an illustrated gallery of the sovereigns of Classical antiquity, as an informative work of curiosity. In 1611 he advised Henri IV to renew the tradition of Antiquity by issuing fine medals to celebrate public and private events of his reign, a propaganda program that was adopted with some consistency by Louis XIV. His request of 10 January 1613, when he was the intendant des Médailles et Antiques du roy, for permission to make coin-medals (monnaies-médailles) of copper to the nominal value of six deniers was forwarded to the Cour des Monnaies. A similar request was dated 30 January 1616. Rascas de Bagarris had broader responsibilities: he drew up the earliest surviving inventory of the royal collection of paintings, ca 1625.

After the assassination of Henry, Rascas de Bagarris returned to Aix with the honorific title of conseiller du roi, intendant des mers atlantiques ("King's counsellor, superintendent of the Atlantic seas"). He served as primicier of the University of Aix.

His protégé Nicolas-Claude Fabri de Peiresc, likewise attached to the Parlement of Aix, received from Rascas de Bagarris his training in the connoisseurship of antiquities and of coins and medals. (Alphéran)

== Sources ==
- François Roux-Alphéran, Les Rues d'Aix (1846): "Louis de Vendôme et la Belle du Canet"
- Michaud, Biographie universelle XXXVII "Rascas"
- Pierre Gassendi, The Mirrour of True Nobility and Gentility: William Rand, translated for John Evelyn. Biography of Peiresc: see under year 1597.
- Site des ordonnances http://monétaires françaises see 10 January 1613, 30 January 1616
