= Treasure of Gourdon =

French treasure

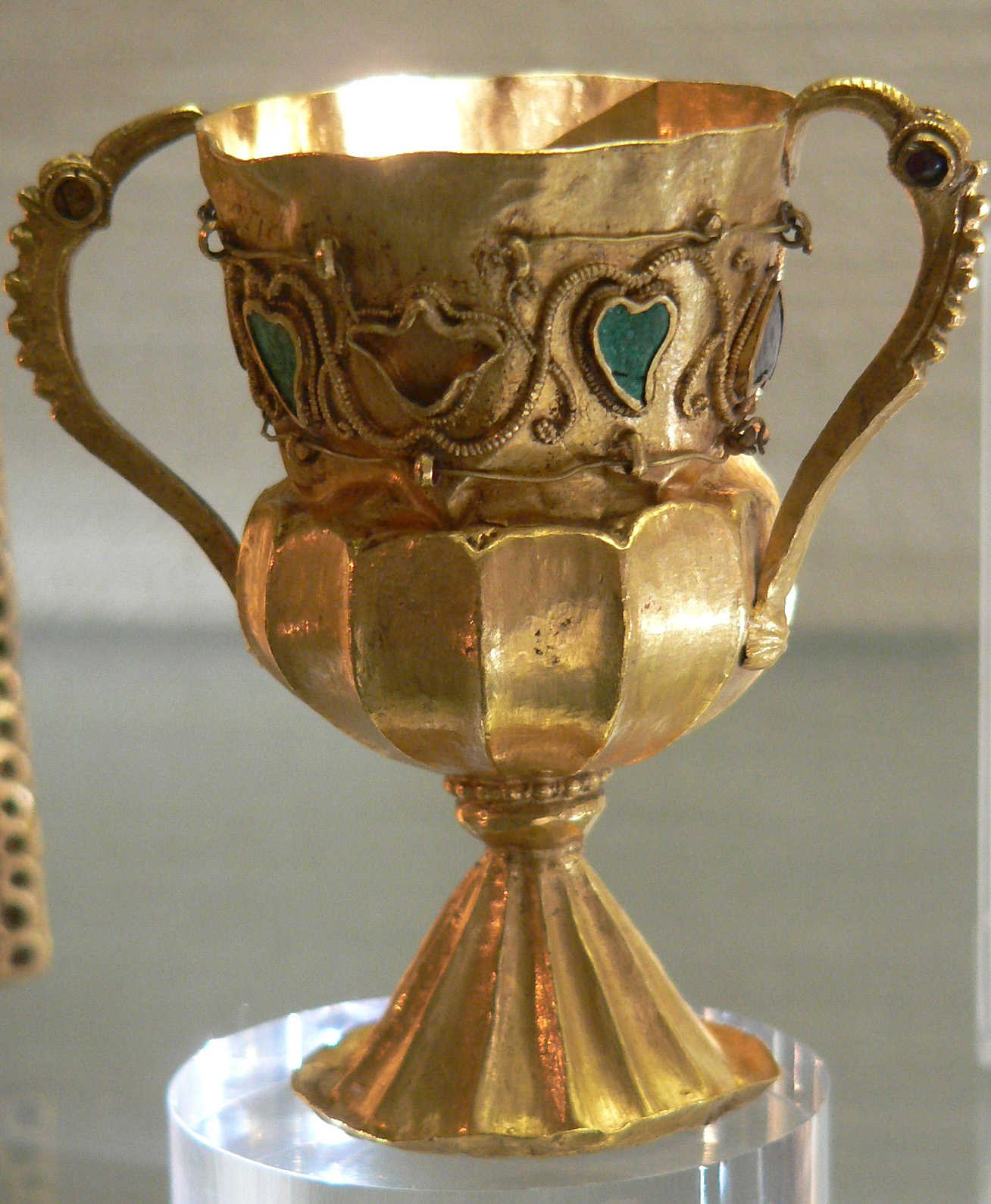
Gold chalice, with garnet and turquoise, from the Treasure of Gourdon Cabinet des Médailles, Paris

The Treasure of Gourdon (French: Trésor de Gourdon) is a hoard of Merovingian gold objects dating to the end of the fifth or the beginning of the sixth century AD. They were secreted soon after 524. It was unearthed in 1845 near Gourdon, Saône-et-Loire.

== Contents ==
When it was found, the hoard comprised a chalice and a rectangular paten that were similarly applied with garnets and turquoises in cloisonné compartments, together with about a hundred gold coins dating from the reigns of Byzantine emperors Leo I (457–474) through Justin I (518–527). The Merovingian king Clovis I converted to Christianity in 496; the chalice and paten might be called early Merovingian or late Gallo-Roman.

The treasure is preserved in the Cabinet des Médailles museum, Paris, a department of the Bibliothèque nationale.

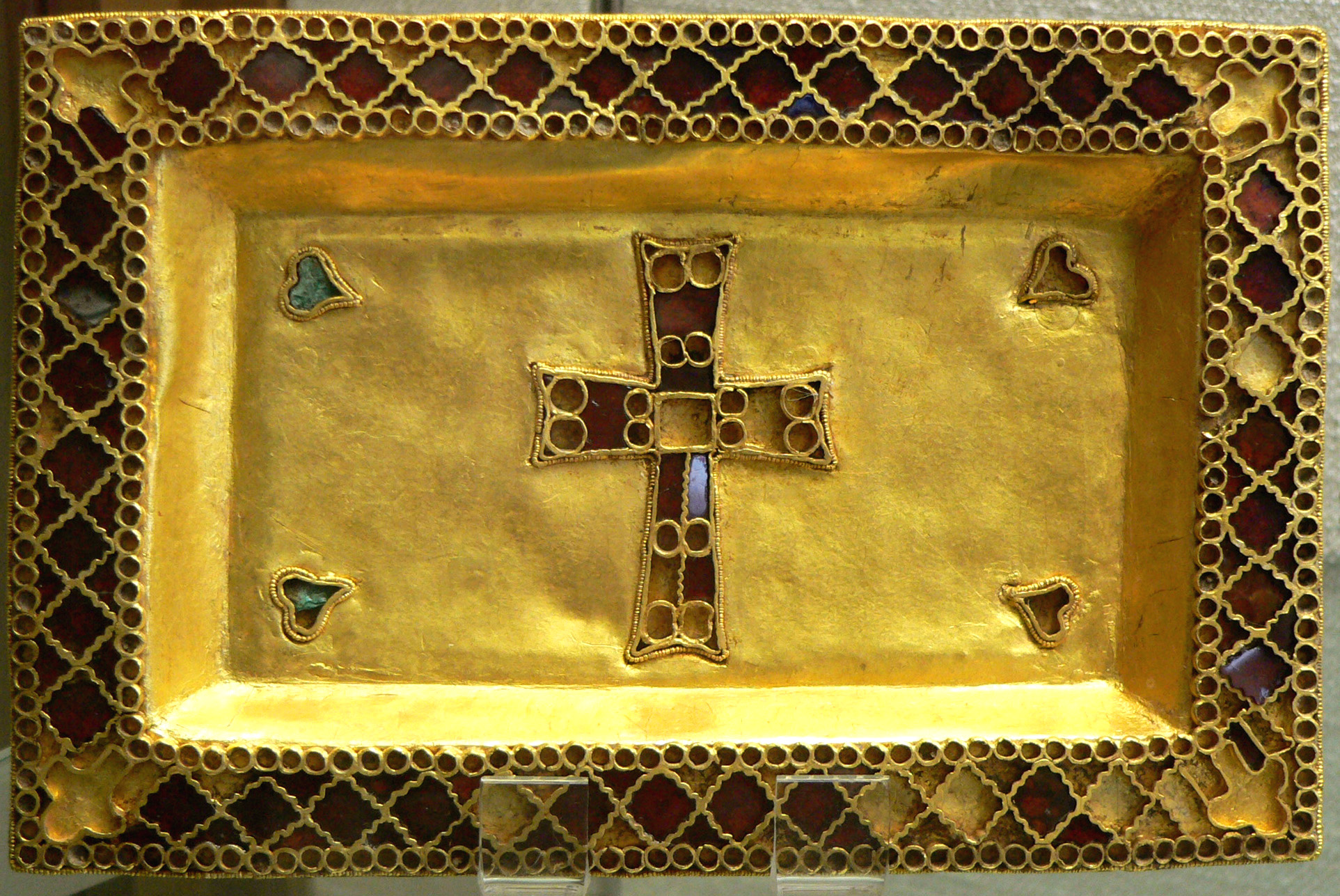
The paten from Gourdon

The chalice is 7.5 centimetres (3.0 in) tall. It rests on a truncated conical base; two handles that take the form of highly stylized birds that are recognizable solely by their beaks and garnets that form the eyes. The body of the chalice has a reverse-dragooned base. The upper part of the chalice is decorated with cloisonné garnets and turquoises cut into the shapes of hearts and palmettes.

The shape of the chalice may be compared to the kantharos of ceramic or metal; a common wine cup shape of the ancient Greeks and Romans. The decoration can be considered "barbarian" in both iconography and technique, and was made uncommonly light and portable by employing the cloisonné technique. Comparable bird motifs may be traced back to Visigoth, Lombard and Merovingian metalwork.

The rectangular paten is 19.5 by 12.5 centimetres (7.7 by 4.9 in) and 1.6 centimetres (0.63 in) deep. It presents a border of cloisonné garnets, a central cross in garnets and four corner motifs of turquoise. The Christian cross unequivocally identifies the ensemble as Christian.

War in eastern Gaul in the 520s came against the Burgundians. It was waged by the four successors of Clovis. The war came to a decisive end with the Battle of Vézeronce, in 524, with a conclusive Burgundian defeat.

== History ==
In the sixth century, Gourdon was the site of a monastery—possibly the source of these objects. The latest date found among the coins that were part of the hoard is estimated to be circa 524. The treasure may have been buried in anticipation of a raid.

A shepherd girl, Louise Forest, discovered it below a Roman tile engraved with a cross. The treasure was sold at auction in Paris, 20 July 1846. The paten and chalice were acquired by the State and the documented coins were dispersed and are not available to the public.

== See also ==
- Hoards with individual articles
