= Wilhelm Fröhner =

French art historian (1834–1925)

Wilhelm Fröhner or Guillaume Frœhner (17 August 1834 – 22 May 1925) was a curator at the Musée du Louvre, an archaeological researcher and collector of antiquities in Paris. As a historian, he publicly rejected Gustave Flaubert's depiction of infanticide in Punic culture, described in Salammbô.

Among his private purchases was the Nazareth Inscription, an imperial Roman inscription in Greek that was sent to him from Nazareth. Unfortunately, part of his working library was lost in the fire at the Duchess Anna Amalia Library in 2004.
