= Painter of Munich 1410 =

Ancient Greek artist

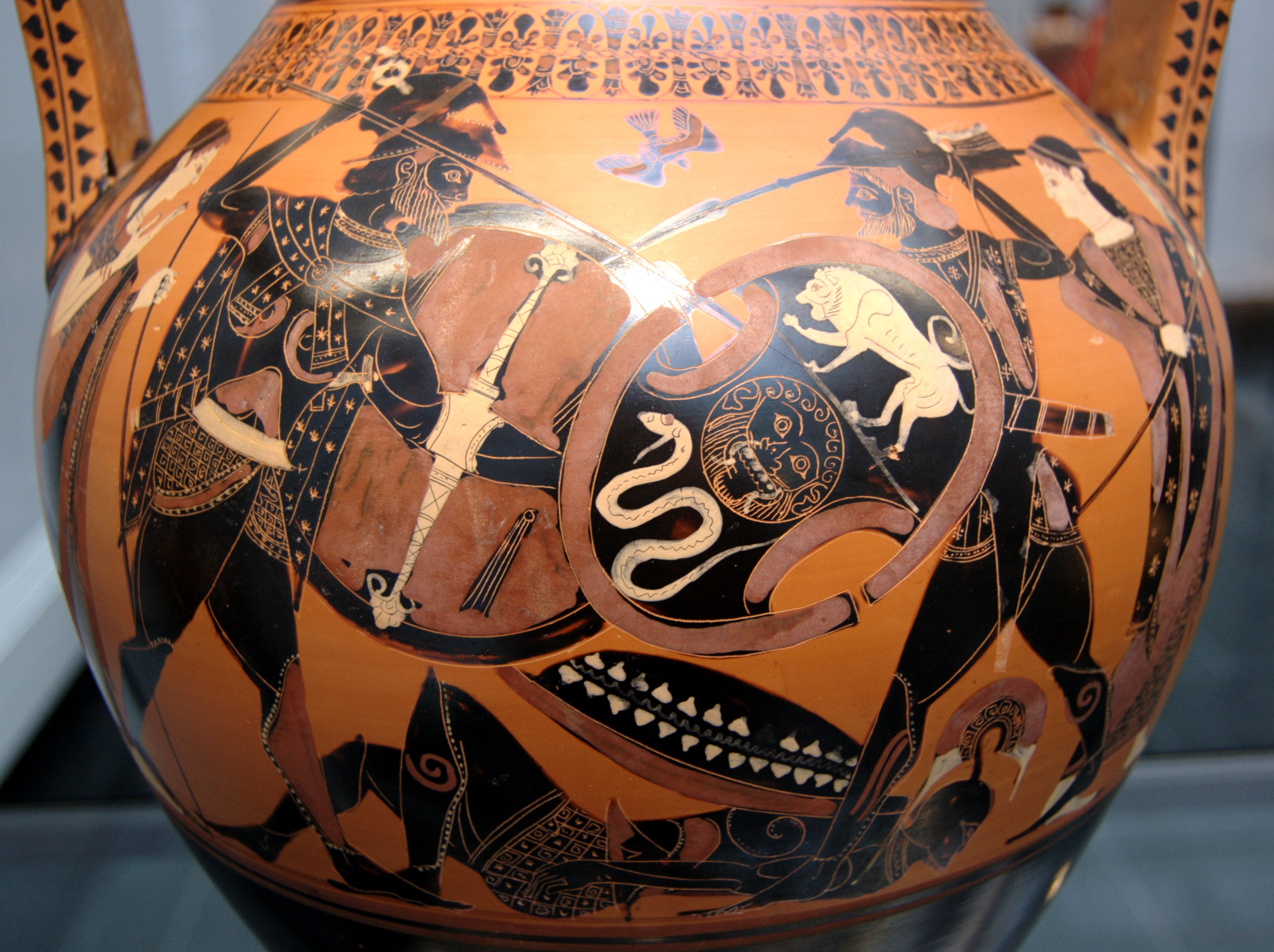
Achilles and Memnon, Between Thetis and Eos, fighting over the body of Antilochos, amphora circa 510 BC. Munich: Staatliche Antikensammlungen.

The Painter of Munich 1410 was an Attic black-figure vase painter, active in the third quarter of the sixth century BC. His real name is not known. He was one of the late representatives of the black-figure style, which was in its final phase due to the introduction of red-figure vase painting. His conventional name is derived from his name vase, on display in the Staatliche Antikensammlungen at Munich (inventory 1410). Although he is not considered an outstanding artist, some notable works are ascribed to him.

== Bibliography ==
- John Beazley: Attic Black-Figure Vase-Painters, Oxford 1956, p.
- John Boardman: Schwarzfigurige Vasen aus Athen. Ein Handbuch, Mainz 1977, ISBN 3-8053-0233-9, p. 71
