= Painter of Berlin A 34 =

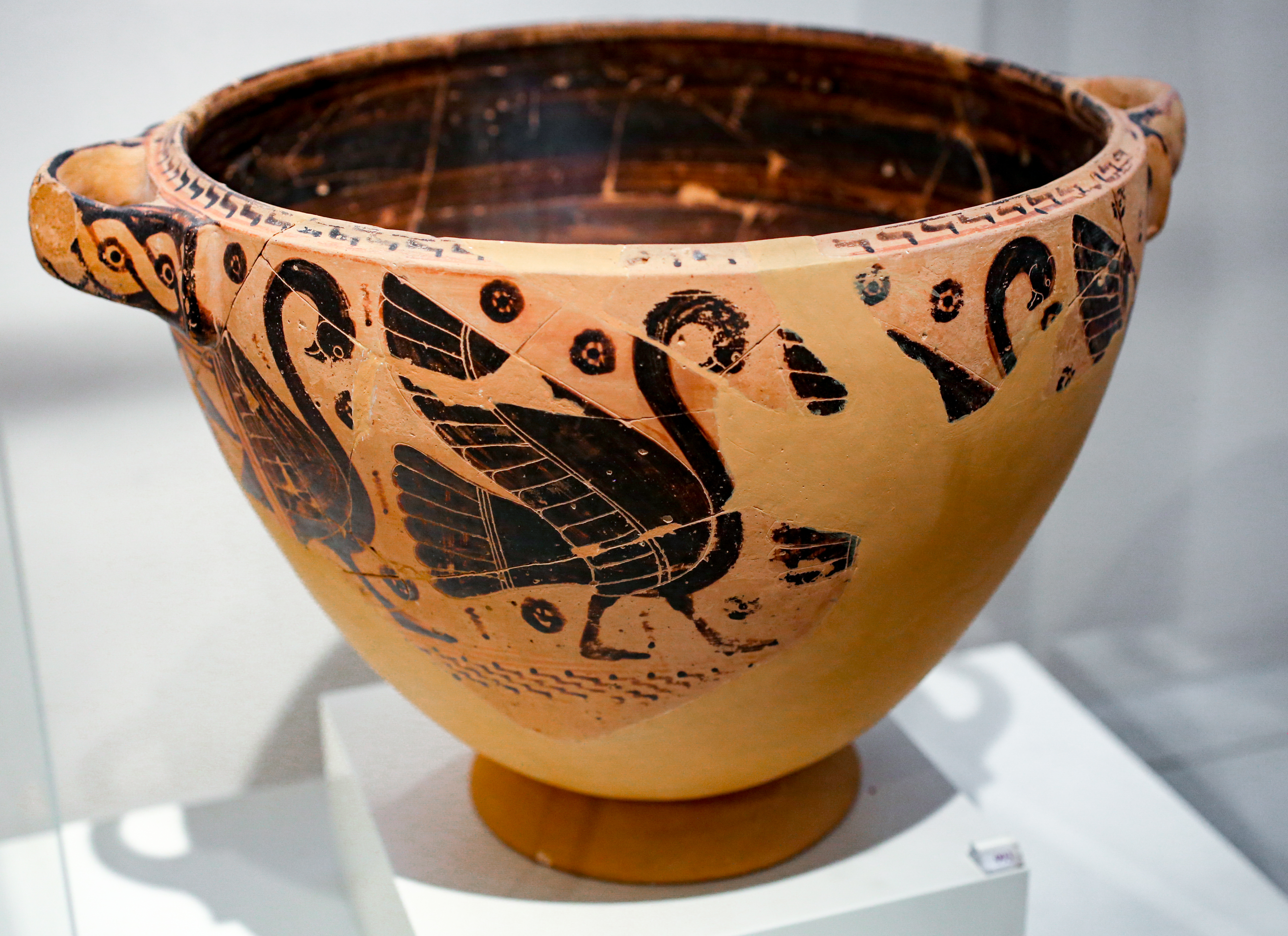
Early black-figure skyphos-krater, front side with swans, back with spiral ornaments and swans’ heads, ‘’circa’’ 630 BC; found at the Vourvas tumulus in Attica, National Museum, Athens.

The Painter of Berlin A 34 was a vase painter during the pioneering period of Attic black-figure pottery. His real name is unknown, his conventional name derived from his name vase in the Antikensammlung Berlin. He is the first individual vase painter of the style in Athens recognised by scholarship. His works are dated to circa 630 BC. Two of his vases were discovered in Aegina. Since the 19th century, those pieces were on display in Berlin, but they disappeared or were destroyed during the Second World War.

The artist is considered one of the best representatives of Protoattic vase painting. Following ancient tradition, he executed the faces of his figures as silhouette drawings. Their clothing, as well as decorative rosettes were applied in red and white paint. He used orientalising zigzag patterns and rosettes. On some of his vases, instead of using the conventional silhouette technique, he applied white paint directly onto a black slip base. His ornamentation is uniform and resembles contemporary Corinthian vases. His activity probably ceased by 620 BC, as no further vases by him are known. Although he is generally considered a pioneer, the breakthrough of the black-figure technique in Athens was probably achieved only by his successors.

The human figures by the Painter of Berlin A 34 are within the pre-black figure (Geometric and Orientalising) vase-painting traditions, but his animals are strongly influenced by contemporary works from Corinth, although they appear more stiff and strict. His name vase, Berlin A 34, depicts a procession of several women, which is why he was initially also called the Women Painter, a conventional name now given to an Attic painter of the red-figure style.

== Works ==
- Berlin, Antikensammlung

Krater A 34

- Athens, Kerameikos-Museum

Krater 130; Skyphos-Krater 801

== Bibliography ==
- John D. Beazley: Attic Black-figure Vase-painters. Oxford 1956, p. 1.
- John Boardman: Schwarzfigurige Vasen aus Athen. Ein Handbuch, von Zabern, 4. edn. Mainz 1994 ISBN 3-8053-0233-9, p. 16.
