= Meleager Painter =

Ancient Greek vase painter

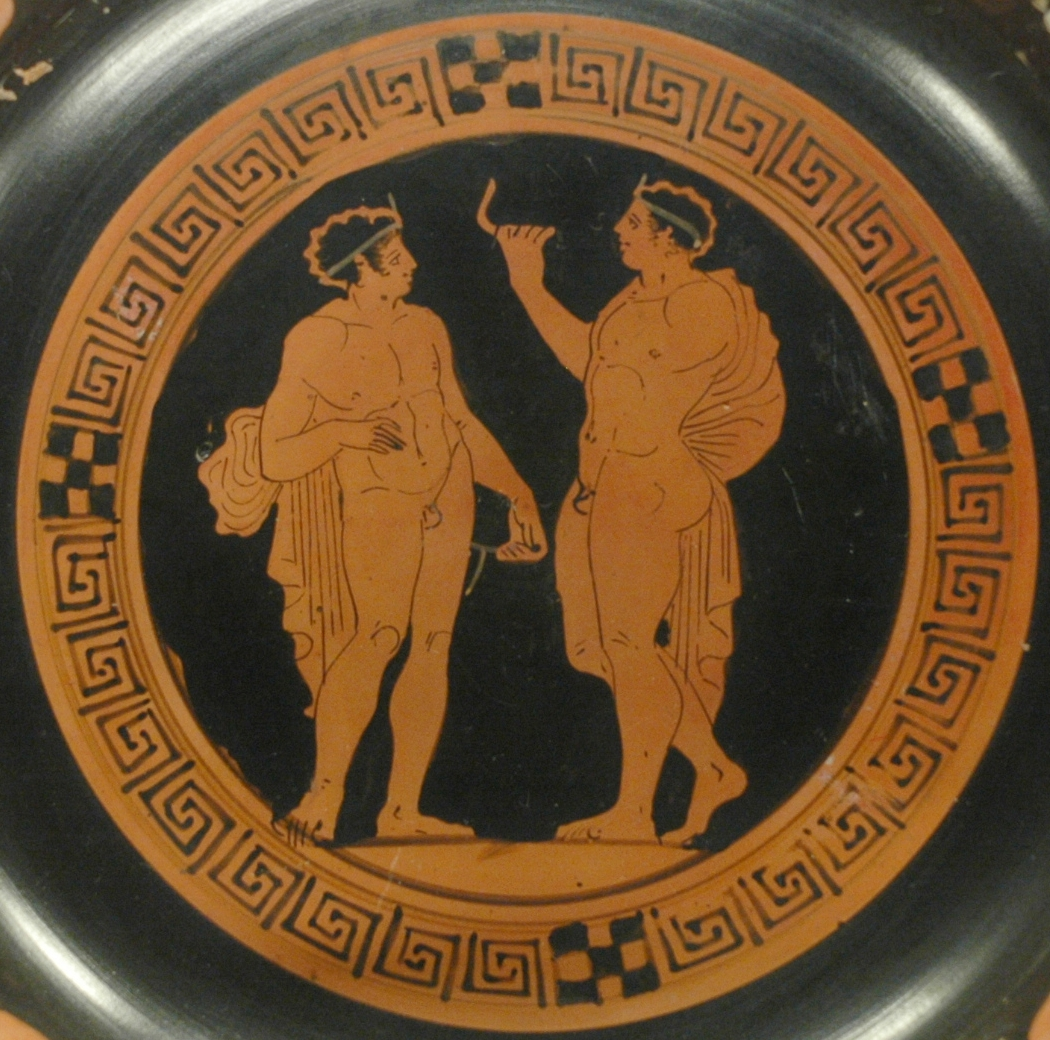
Two athletes. Tondo of a bowl, circa 400/375 BC. Paris, Louvre

The Meleager Painter was an ancient Greek vase painter of the Attic red-figure style. He was active in the first third of the 4th century BC. The Meleager Painter followed a tradition started by a group of slightly earlier artists, such as the Mikion Painter. He is probably the most important painter of his generation. He painted a wide variety of vase shapes, including even kylikes, a rarity among his contemporaries.

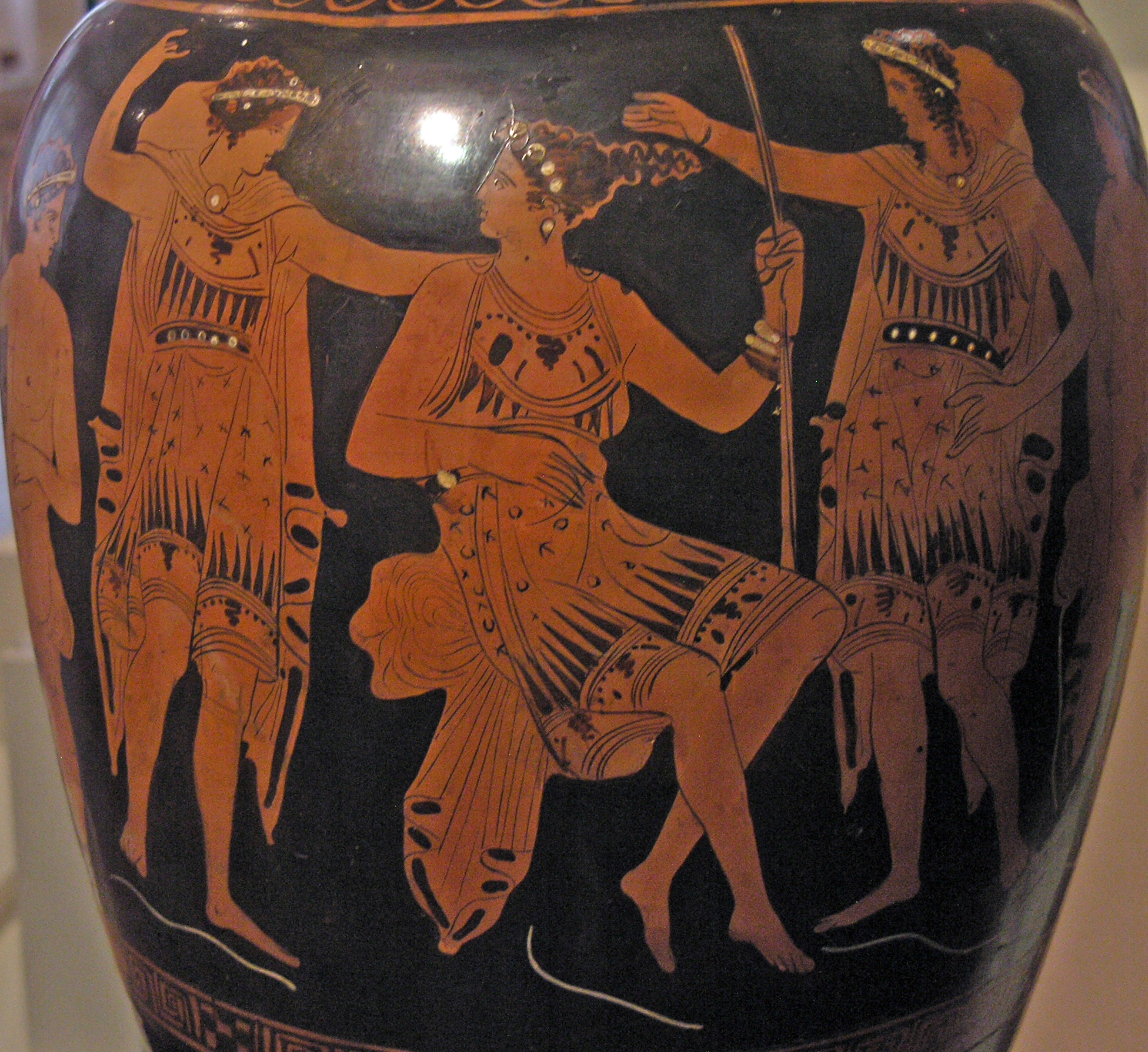
The Calydonian boar hunt on his name vase: Atalante seated, flanked by Meleagros and perhaps Tydeus, Nolan amphora, circa 300/375 BC. Athens, National Archaeological Museum

His conventional name is derived from several vases depicting hunters, including Atalante and her lover Meleagros. Colonette kraters and bell kraters by him normally bear Dionysiac motifs. Like other painters of his time, he liked to paint figures wearing oriental garb. The tondos inside his kylikes are often framed by wreaths. They mostly depict groups of deities or individual gods. The outsides of kylikes and the paintings on the backs of other vases by him are often of inferior quality.

== Bibliography ==
- John D. Beazley. Attic Red Figure Vase Painters. Oxford: Clarendon Press, 1963.
- John Boardman. Rotfigurige Vasen aus Athen. Die klassische Zeit, Philipp von Zabern, Mainz, 1991 (Kulturgeschichte der Antiken Welt, Band 48), besonders, p. 176 ISBN 3-8053-1262-8.
