= Nazareth Inscription =

1st-century marble tablet inscribed in Greek

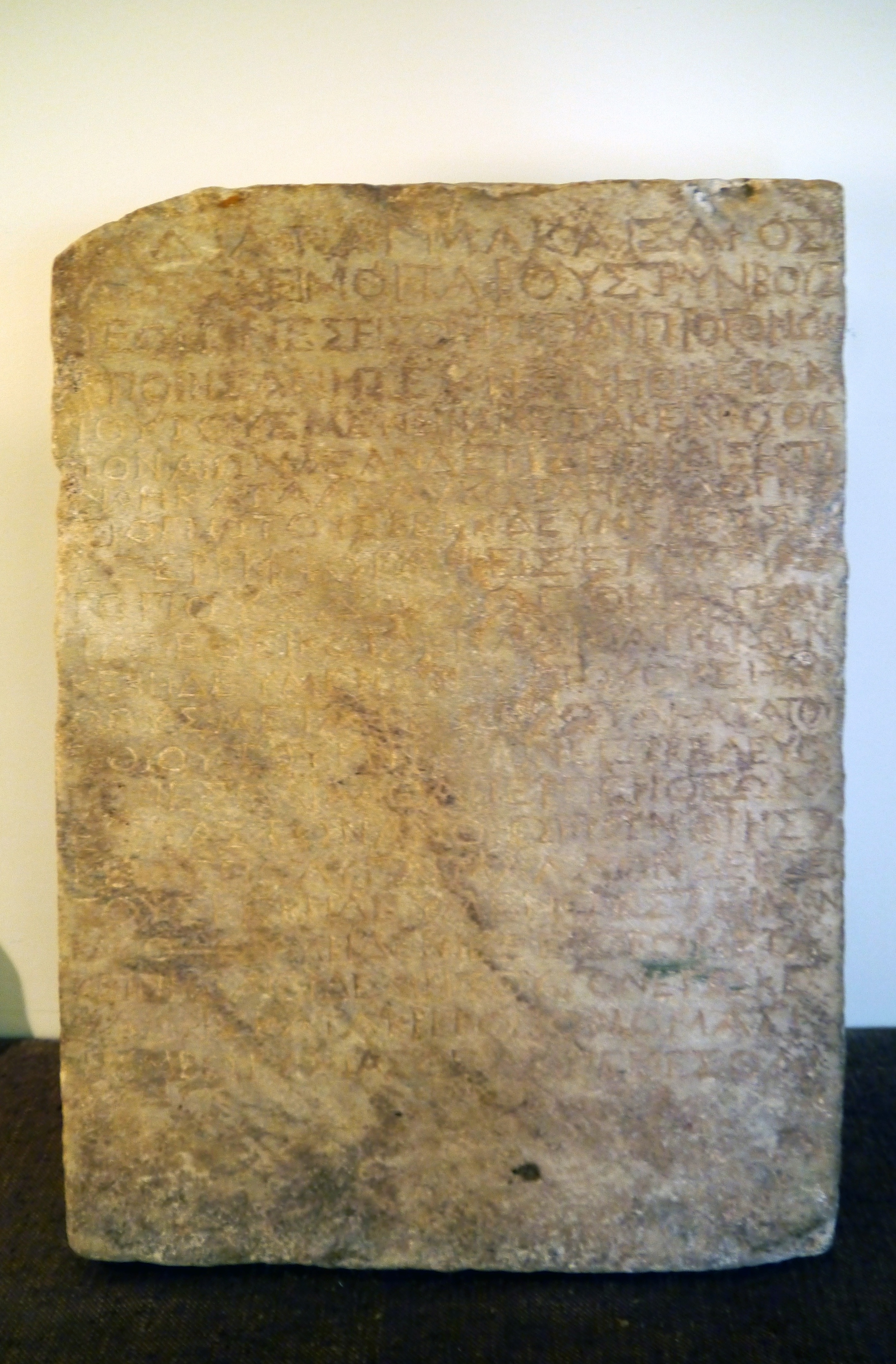
The inscription at the BnF Museum.

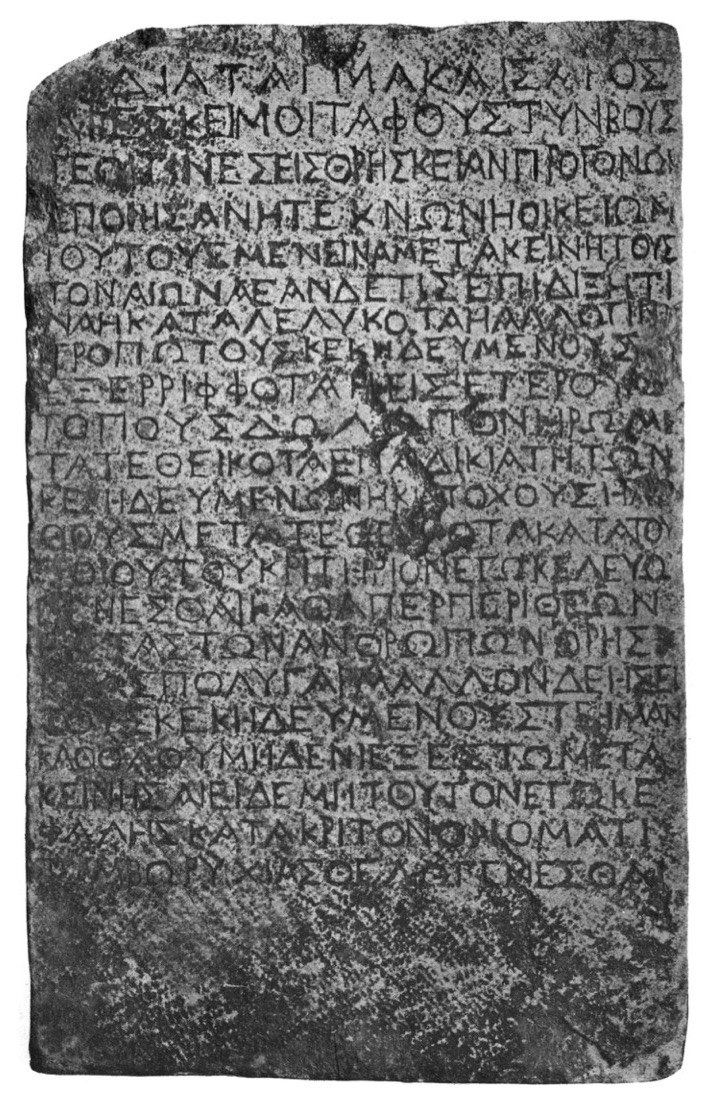
The inscription, in a facsimile from its original publication in 1930.

The Nazareth Inscription or Nazareth decree is a marble tablet inscribed in Greek with an edict from an unnamed Caesar ordering capital punishment for anyone caught disturbing graves or tombs. It is dated on the basis of epigraphy to the first half of the 1st century AD. Its provenance is unknown, but a French collector acquired the stone from Nazareth. It is now in the collections of the Louvre.

The text is read by scholars in the context of Roman law pertaining to exhumation and reburial, mentioned also by Pliny. The inscription is of interest to some authors for its indirect relationship to Jesus of Nazareth, even though the text contains no reference to him. A 2020 study of the marble's isotopes showed that the tablet came from a quarry in the Greek island of Kos, casting much doubt on the theory that it has any relationship to Jesus, and it may instead have been inscribed as a reaction to the desecration of the grave of the Kos tyrant Nikias circa 20 BCE.

== Description and provenance ==
Map of the Decapolis (cities in black) and nearby areas including unmarked Samaria which is the northern part of the Roman province of Judea.

The marble tablet measures 24 by 15 inches, with the koine Greek inscription appearing in fourteen lines. It was acquired in 1878 by Wilhelm Fröhner (1834–1925), and sent from Nazareth to Paris. Fröhner entered the item in his manuscript inventory with the note "Dalle de marbre envoyé de Nazareth en 1878." Though indicating that the marble was sent from Nazareth, the note does not state that it was discovered there. Nazareth was a significant antiquities market in the 1870s, as was Jerusalem, and may have been "nothing more than … a shipping center" for the item. Since 1925 it has been in the Bibliothèque nationale, Paris, displayed in the Cabinet des Médailles.

The inscription, with a facsimile, was published in 1930 by Franz Cumont, who had been alerted to it by Rostovtseff.

== Text ==
The Greek used in the inscription is relatively poor. Clyde E. Billington provides the following English translation:

Edict of Caesar
It is my decision [concerning] graves and tombs—whoever has made them for the religious observances of parents, or children, or household members—that these remain undisturbed forever. But if anyone legally charges that another person has destroyed, or has in any manner extracted those who have been buried, or has moved with wicked intent those who have been buried to other places, committing a crime against them, or has moved sepulcher-sealing stones, against such a person, I order that a judicial tribunal be created, just as [is done] concerning the gods in human religious observances, even more so will it be obligatory to treat with honor those who have been entombed. You are absolutely not to allow anyone to move [those who have been entombed]. But if [someone does], I wish that [violator] to suffer capital punishment under the title of tomb-breaker.

== Legal and cultural background ==
Violatio sepulchri ('tomb violation') was a crime under Roman law, as noted by Cicero (d. 43 BC). The Nazareth Inscription prescribes the death penalty for the offense. A tomb at which funeral rites had been duly performed became a locus religiosus, belonging to the divine rather than to the human realm. Roman Imperial tombstones are often inscribed with a curse (defixio) against anyone who desecrates the grave.

== Analysis ==
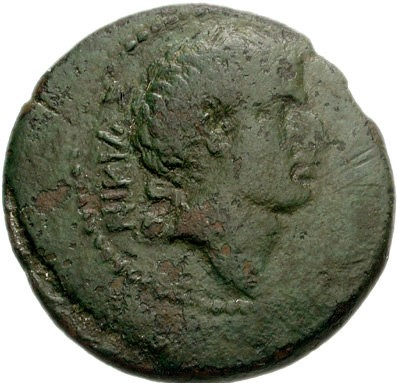
Coin showing image of Nikias of Kos, Ruler of Kos from c. 50 BCE to c. 20 BCE. The Nazareth inscription is believed by researchers to be in response to disturbing his grave.

Scholars have analysed the language and style of the Nazareth inscription and attempted to date it. It has been discussed in the context of tomb-robbery in antiquity.

Francis de Zulueta dates the inscription, based on the style of lettering, to between 50 B.C. and A.D. 50, but most likely around the turn of the era. As the text uses the plural form "gods", Zulueta concluded it most likely came from the Hellenized district of the Decapolis. Like Zulueta, J. Spencer Kennard, Jr. noted that the reference to "Caesar" indicated that "the inscription must have been derived from somewhere in Samaria or Decapolis; Galilee was ruled by a client-prince until the reign of Claudius".

It is of interest to historians of the New Testament. Some authors, citing the inscription's supposed Galilean origin, interpreted it as Imperial Rome's clear reaction to the empty tomb of Jesus and specifically as an edict of Claudius, who reigned AD 41-54. If the inscription was originally set up in Galilee, it can date no earlier than 44, the year Roman rule was imposed there.

A 2020 isotope study of the marble published in the Journal of Archaeological Science suggests another interpretation. The scientists took a sample from the back of the tablet, and used laser ablation to help determine the isotope ratio of the stone. According to the authors of the study, the enrichment of carbon 13 and depletion of Oxygen 18 may identify the source of the marble as the upper quarry in the island of Kos. The team proposed that the edict was issued by Augustus after the desecration of the tomb of the Kos tyrant Nikias.
