= Nicias of Kos =

1st-century BC tyrant of Kos

Nikias of Kos
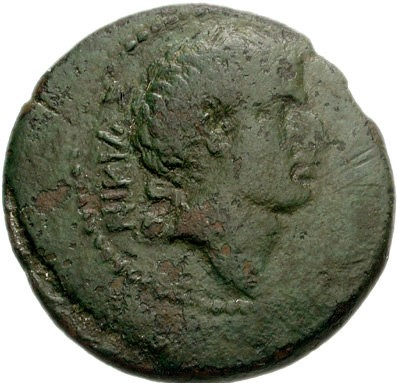
- Occupation: Ruler of Kos
- Years active: c. 50 BCE to c. 20 BCE

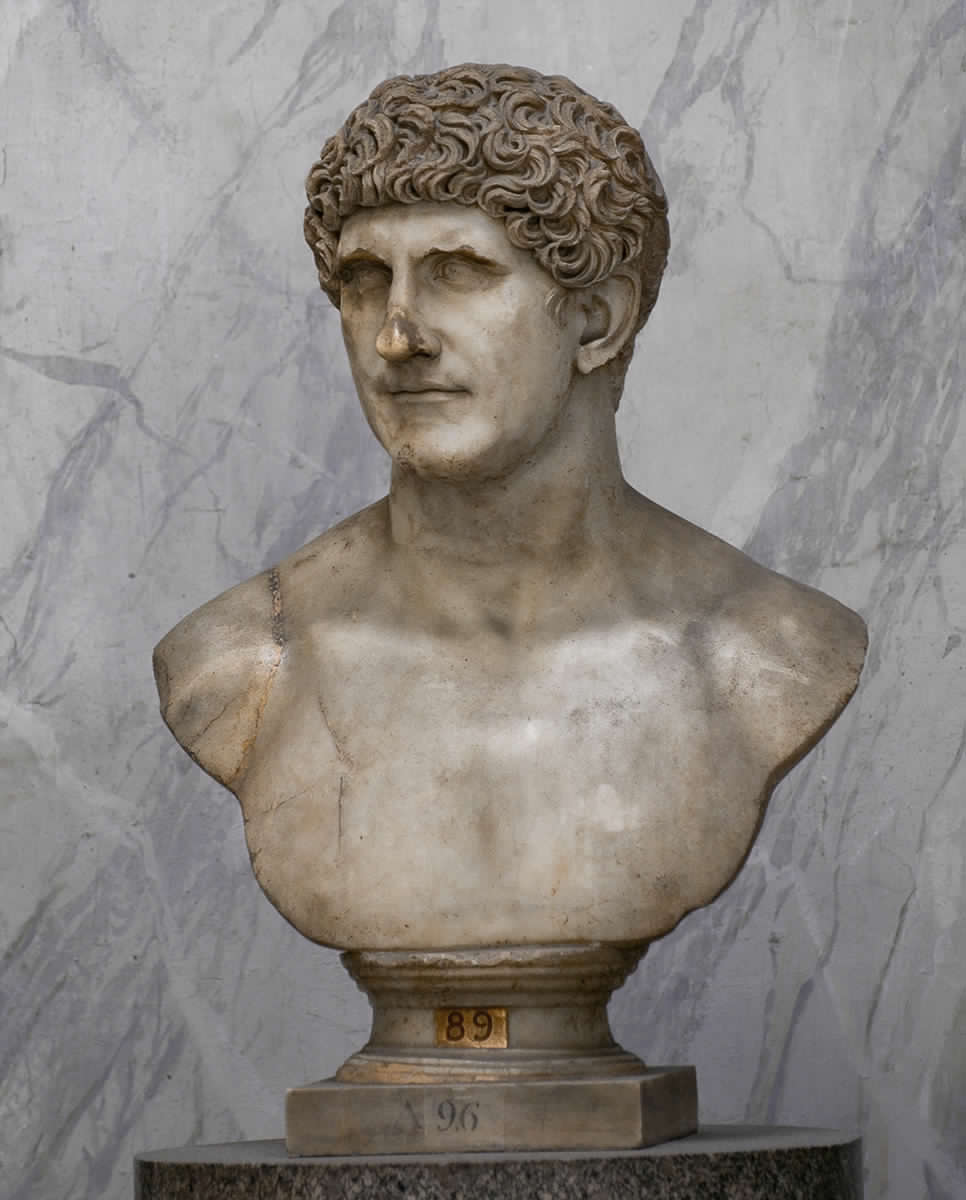
Bust of Mark Antony, Nicias' patron.

Nicias (Ancient Greek: Νικίας; died c. 20 BCE), also known as Curtius Nicias, was a ruler of the island of Kos under Roman rule, during the Second Triumvirate and the early reign of Augustus. He is known from coinage, inscriptions, and anecdotes in ancient literary sources. Ancient sources call him a tyrant. The desecration of his tomb may have prompted the Nazareth Inscription.

== Reign ==
The date of Nicias' coinage and of anecdotes about him in literary sources indicate that he ruled during the Second Triumvirate and into the reign of Augustus. He appears to have led a regime at Kos that supported Augustus' opponent Mark Antony and to have remained in power after Augustus defeated Antony at the Battle of Actium in 31 BCE.

Aelian reports in his Varia Historia that Nicias had a sheep that gave birth to a lion, which was a sign that he would be tyrant. Kostas Buraselis identifies this story as a literary trope, designed to reinforce a ruler's legitimacy and perhaps also indicating that Nicias came from low birth. Anna Heller accepts the former possibility, but is sceptical about the latter.

Bronze coins created during Nicias' rule begin around 50 BCE. On the obverse they have a portrait of a "young man with rather curly hair, broad forehead, hooked nose, some sparse chin hair, and a serious expression conveyed by his eyes and the downward line of his lips" and the legend "Nicias" (Ancient Greek: ΝΙΚΙΑΣ). On the reverse, they have a portrait of Asclepius (the patron god of Kos) and two legends, one naming the annual mint magistrate and another reading "of the Koans" (Ancient Greek: ΚΩΙΩΝ) Nicias wears a headband, which has been identified by some scholars as a diadem (the symbol of kingship in the Hellenistic period), a wreath, or an infula – a knotted band associated with sacred beings and designed to assimilate him to the god Asclepius.

=== Relations with Rome ===
From 62 until around 52 BCE, Nicias was in Rome, where he became acquainted with Cicero, Pompey and other political figures of the day. Pompey, along with Gaius Memmius, gained him Roman citizenship under the name of Curtius Nicias. In a letter of 55 BCE, Cicero describes him as a friend of his addressee Marcus Fadius Gallus as well as the triumvir Marcus Licinius Crassus, and mentions seeking his advice in relation to a matter to do with his house. In later letters of 45 BCE, he mentions the 'cultivated conversation' he had previously enjoyed with Nicias., as well as the mushrooms Nicias served at a dinner-party attended by various figures of the Roman elite. Suetonius later described him as a familiaris (intimate friend) of Cicero's.

Between 56 and 52 BCE, after Memmius' unsuccessful prosecution of Metellus Scipio for electoral crimes, he persuaded Nicias to act on his behalf in a scheme to seduce Pompey's wife, either Julia, the daughter of Julius Caesar (who died in 54 BCE), or Cornelia, the daughter of Metellus, whom Pompey married in 52. Pompey's wife, however, revealed the letter to him, leading Pompey to revoke his favour towards Nicias and banish him from his house.

He joined Publius Cornelius Dolabella on his expedition to Parthia in 44 BCE.

=== Altars ===
More than twenty little stone altars associated with Nicias have been found on Kos, all of which bear an identical text:

θεοῖς πατρῴοις ὑπὲρ τᾶς Νικία τοῦ δάμου υἱοῦ, φιλοπάτριδος, ἥρωος, εὐεργέτα, δὲ τᾶς πόλιος σωτηρίας

(Dedicated) to the ancestral gods, for the well-being of Nicias, son of the people, lover of the fatherland, hero, and benefactor of the city.

The number and modest size of these altars indicates that they were originally set up in private houses. The uniformity of their inscriptions suggests that they were erected in response to a decree - perhaps from Nicias himself. The inscription on these altars closely identifies Nicias with Kos and its people, presenting his devotion to the state as equivalent to the filial piety of a son to his father. This is the first attestation of the title "son of the People (damos, Doric Greek for demos)," which would become a common honorific for civic benefactors in the Roman Imperial period. Usually, Greek individuals are named with a patronymic (the name of their father), but this is absent from all the altars. Kostas Buraselis suggests that this was intended to present him as a 'man of the people', to obscure a humble birth, and to present himself as semi-divine. According to Anna Heller, the association with a humble birth is unpersuasive, and the lack of the patronymic should be understood as an effort to emphasise Nicias' filial devotion to Kos and a result of the novelty of the "son of the People" title. The formula "for the well-being of" derives from dedications erected in honour of Hellenistic kings.

=== Literary works ===
Nicias was known in antiquity as a grammarian and the author of a commentary on the works of Gaius Lucilius. However, he receives few mentions in ancient authors and does not appear to have been considered particularly significant: while Suetonius accords him a short entry in his Lives of the Grammarians, even his friend Cicero did not consider him a trustworthy source on the correct name of the town of Piraeea.

== Posthumous fate and reputation ==
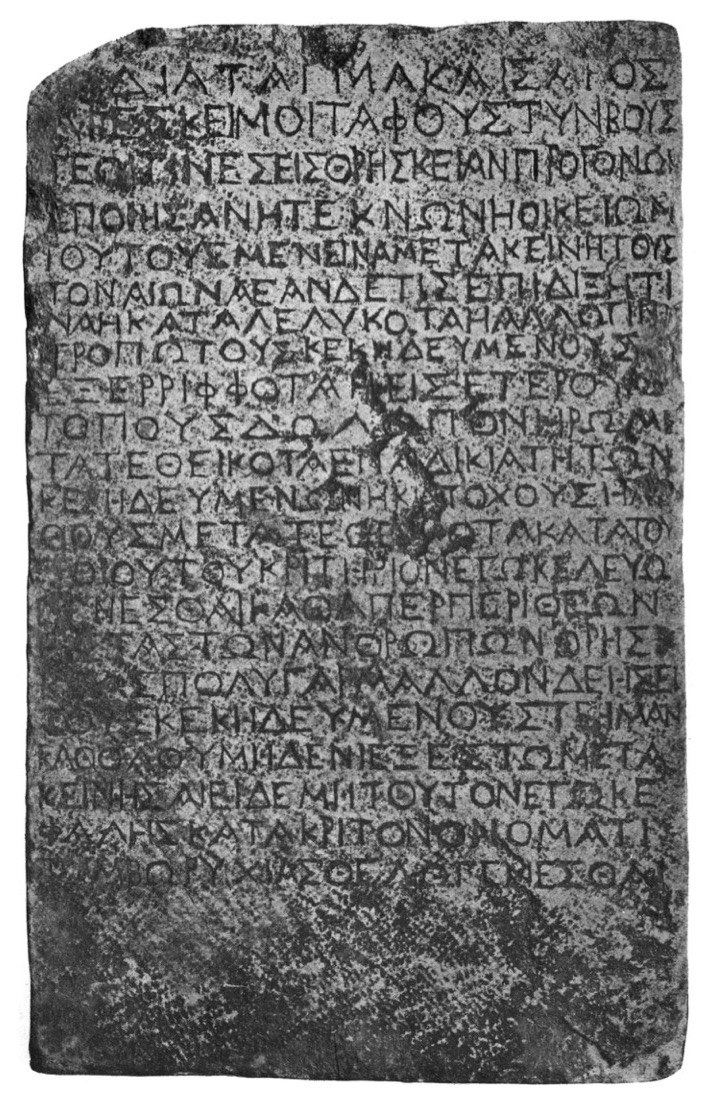
The Nazareth inscription, in a facsimile from its original publication in 1930.

After his death, Nicias was remembered as a tyrant. The geographer Strabo calls him a tyrant who was opposed by the "renowned harper" Theomnestus. A bust of a child, known only from a short report and photography published by G. Iakopich in 1928, bears a graffito reading "Nicias the tyrant" that may form part of a denigration of Nicias following his death.

According to a poem on Nicias by the epigrammatist Crinagoras of Mytilene preserved in the Palatine Anthology, Nicias' tomb was desecrated after his death:

Tell me not that death is the end of life.
The dead, like the living, have their own causes of suffering.
Look at the fate of Nicias of Cos.
He had gone to rest in Hades, and now his dead body has come again into the light of day.
For his fellow-citizens, forcing the bolts of his tomb, dragged out the poor hard-dying wretch to punishment.

In 2020, researchers showed that the Nazareth Inscription, an edict proclaimed by a Caesar, which bans the desecration of tombs and is sometimes connected with the tomb of Jesus, is made from Koan marble. They proposed that it might have been issued by Augustus following the desecration of Nicias' tomb by the people of Kos.

A decree from Kos, probably dating to the late first century CE, revises the list of priests of Apollo as part of a process of destroying and replaces "all the inadmissibly and illegally engraved inscriptions". The illegal priests seem to be those who served during Nicias' reign. Buraselis proposes that the long delay between Nicias' death and the reform of this list indicates that immediately after his death there was significant continuity, with positive and negative perspectives on him in conflict with one another.

== Bibliography ==
- Buraselis, Kostas (2000). Kos Between Hellenism and Rome. American Philosophical Society. pp. 30–64. ISBN 978-0-87169-904-6.
- Haley, Shelley (1985). "The Five Wives of Pompey the Great". Greece and Rome. 32 (1): 49–59. doi:10.1017/S0017383500030138. JSTOR 642299. S2CID 154822339.
- Harper, Kyle; McCormick, Michael; Hamilton, Matthew; Peiffert, Chantal; Michels, Raymond; Engel, Michael (April 2020). "Establishing the provenance of the Nazareth Inscription: Using stable isotopes to resolve a historic controversy and trace ancient marble production" (PDF). Journal of Archaeological Science: Reports. 30 102228. Bibcode:2020JArSR..30j2228H. doi:10.1016/j.jasrep.2020.102228. S2CID 212890727.
- Heller, Anna (2020). L'âge d'or des bienfaiteurs : titres honorifiques et sociétés civiques dans l'Asie Mineure d'époque romaine: Ier s. av. J.-C.-s. - IIIe apr. J.-C. Genève: Librairie Droz. pp. 42–49. ISBN 978-2-600-05746-2.
- Morgan, Llewellyn (2015-07-20). "Sex and the Eternal City". Lugubelinus.
