= Lakaina =

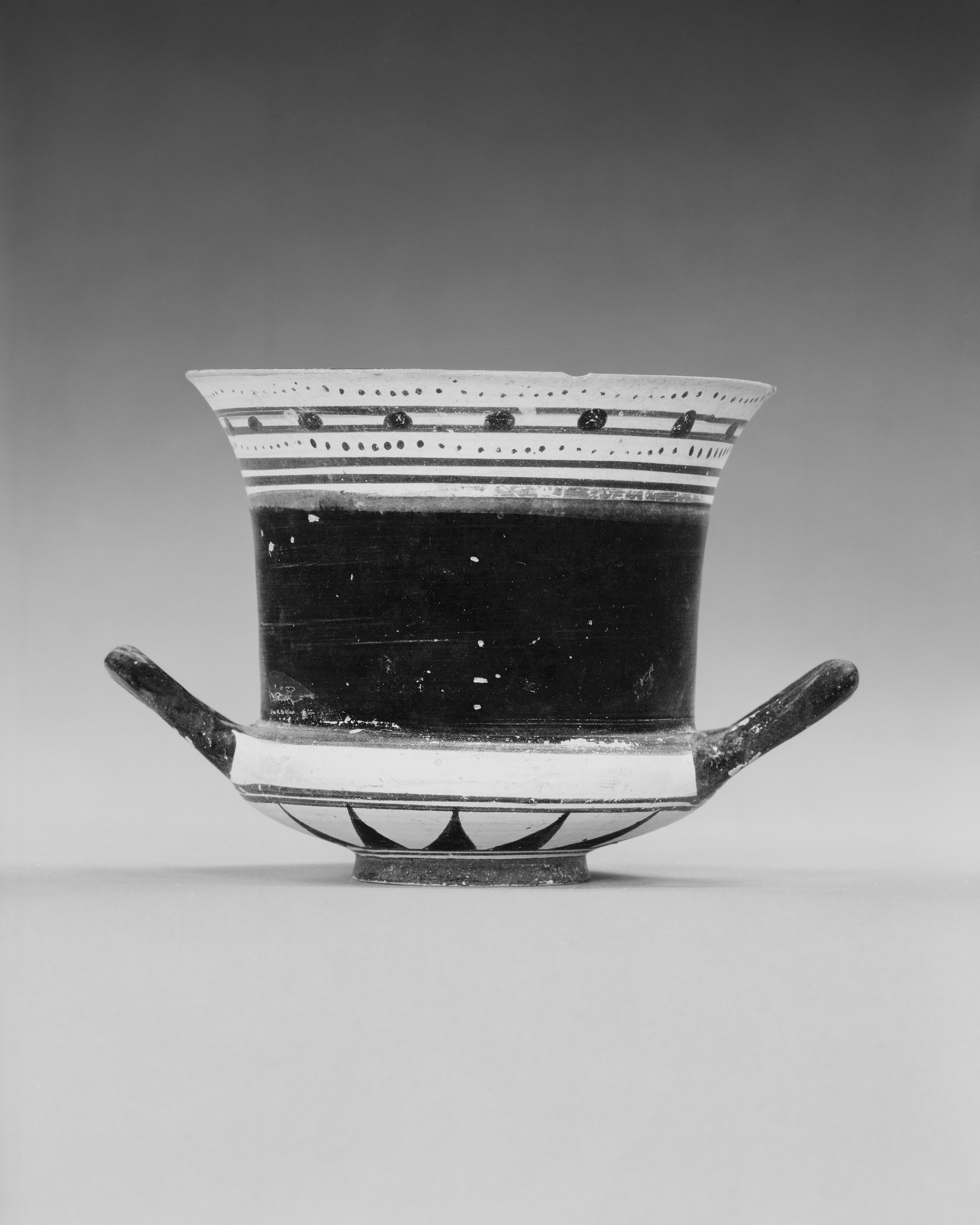
Terracotta lakaina, 6th century B.C., Metropolitan Museum of Art

A lakaina (λᾴκαινα, plural lakainai) is a specific form of pottery vessel.

The lakaina was a drinking vessel. It is a high, two-part cup with a very high added rim. Two horizontal handles are affixed to the lower part of the cylindrical bowl. The term is preserved through the Deipnosophistai by Athenaios. He explains the term is based on the shape's origin in Sparta, in the region of Laconia. Modern research supports this view. On average, the cups have a height of about 10 cm. Unlike in most parts of the rest of Greece, in Laconia the rather beaker-like lakaina was preferred to simpler and shallower cup types. Such shallow cups were, however, produced in Sparta for export. Lakainai decorated by the Naucratis Painter and the Hunt Painter survive.

== Bibliography ==
- Thomas Mannack: Griechische Vasenmalerei. Eine Einführung. Theiss, Stuttgart 2002, p. 126 ISBN 3-8062-1743-2.
- Wolfgang Schiering: Die griechischen Tongefässe. Gestalt, Bestimmung und Formenwandel. 2. edn. Mann, Berlin 1983, p. 148f. ISBN 3-7861-1325-4 (Gebr.-Mann-Studio-Reihe).
