= BnF Museum =

Department of the National Library of France tasked with historical artifacts

Coordinates: 48.8678°N 2.3384°E

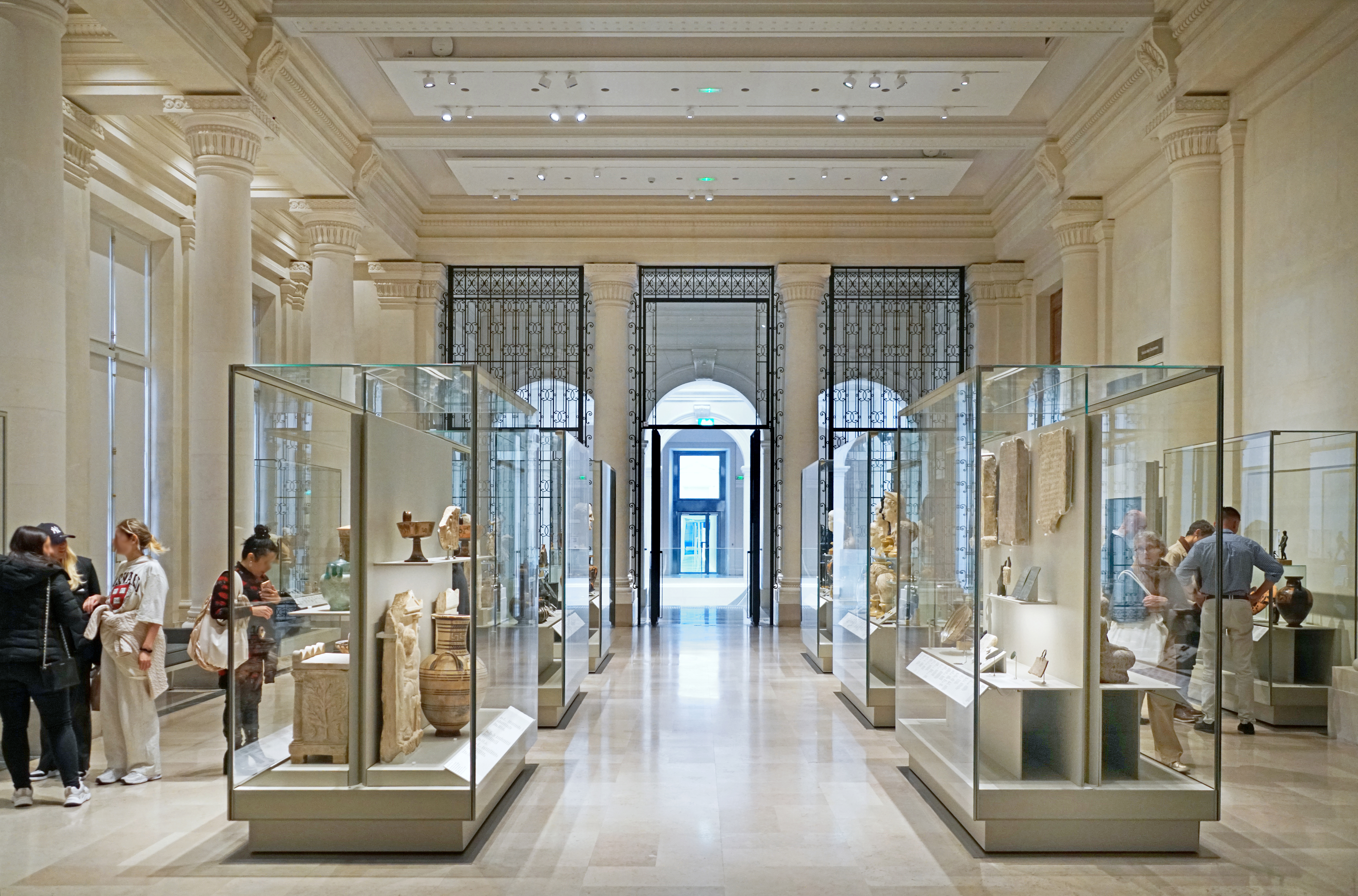
- Salle des Colonnes
- Established: (1560–1574)
- Collections: Ancient objects including several from the Treasury of Saint-Denis, books, manuscripts, coins, medals

The BnF Museum or Museum of the Bibliothèque nationale de France, formerly known as the Cabinet des Médailles (French pronunciation: [kabinɛ de medaj]), is a significant art and history museum in Paris. It displays collections of the Département des Monnaies, Médailles et Antiques de la Bibliothèque nationale de France as well as manuscripts and books from the Library's collections. The BnF Museum is located in the Richelieu site, the former main building of the library bordering rue de Richelieu.

== Overview ==
The Cabinet des Médailles is a museum containing internationally important collections of coins, engraved gems, and antiquities, with its distant origins in the treasuries of the French kings of the Middle Ages. The disruptions of the Wars of Religion inspired Charles IX (1560–1574) to create the position of a garde particulier des médailles et antiques du roi ("Special guardian of the King's medals and antiques"). Thus the collection, which has been augmented and never again dispersed – unlike the first royal library, assembled at the Palais du Louvre by Charles V, which contained 973 volumes when it was inventoried in 1373, but was dispersed during the following century. It passed from being the personal collection of the king to becoming a national property – a bien national – as the royal collection was declared during the Revolution. A stage in this aspect of its development was the bequest of the collection of pioneering archeologist Anne Claude de Caylus, who knew that in this fashion his antiquities would be most accessible to scholars. Other collectors followed suit: when the duc de Luynes gave his collection of Greek coins to the Cabinet Impérial in 1862, it was a national collection rather than simply an Imperial one he was enriching. The state also added to the treasury contained in the Cabinet des Médailles: a notable addition, in 1846, was the early sixth century gold Treasure of Gourdon.

The cabinet, in the sense of a small private room for the conservation and display of intimate works of art and for private conversations, rather than a piece of furniture, took a stable shape under Henry IV, who nominated the connoisseur Rascas de Bagarris garde particulier des médailles et antiques du roi, the "particular guardian of the medals and antiquities of the King".

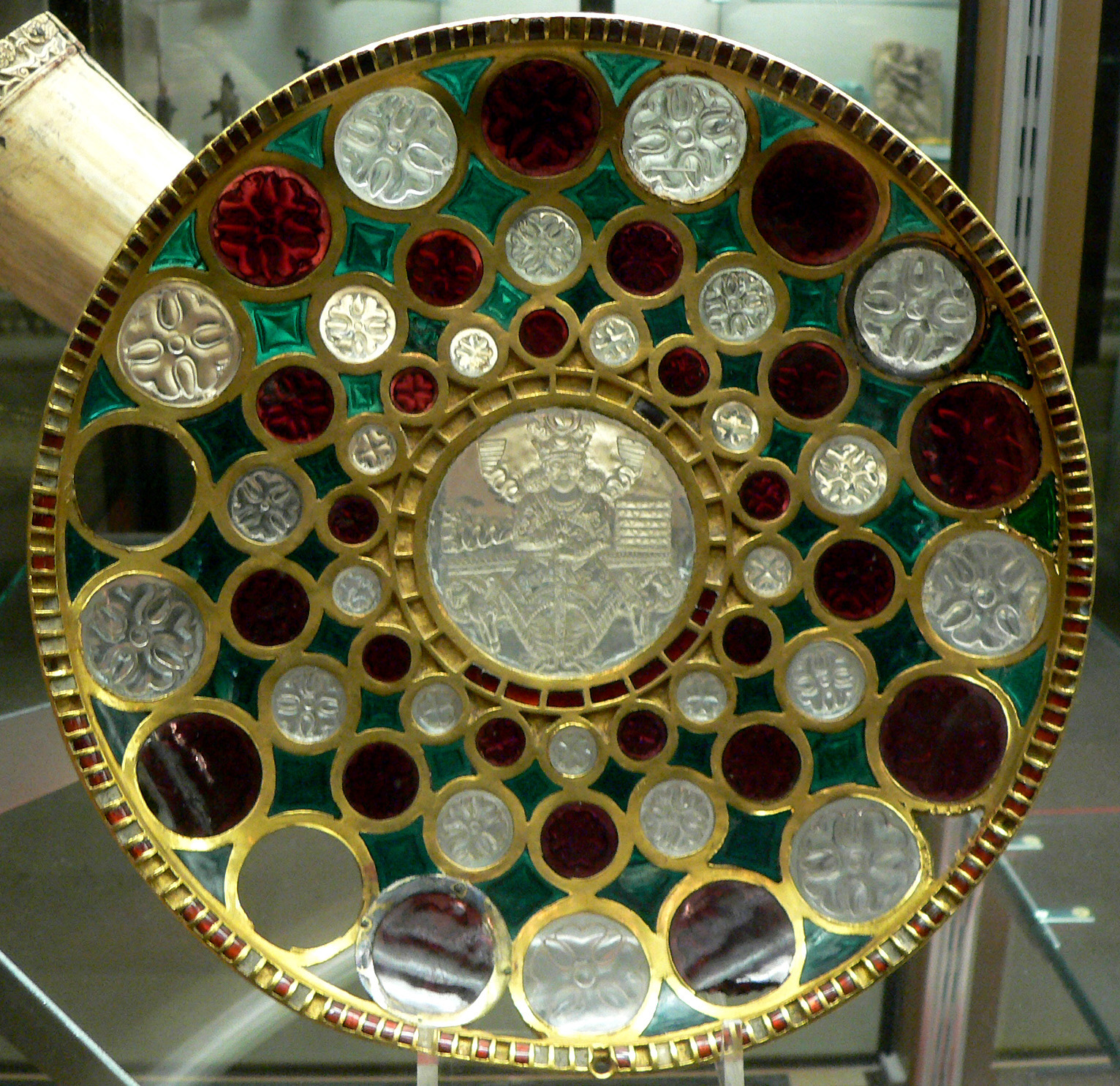
The Sassanid "Cup of Chosroes", from Saint-Denis, where it was treasured as "King Solomon's Cup".

Among the antiquarians and scholars who have had the charge of the Cabinet des Médailles, one of the most outstanding was Théophile Marion Dumersan, who began working there in 1795 at the age of sixteen, protected the collection from dispersal by the allies after Napoleon's defeat, and published at his own expense a history of the collection and description, as newly rearranged according to historical principles, in 1838

Earlier printed catalogues of parts of the collection had been published. Pierre-Jean Mariette, urged by the comte de Caylus, published a selection of the royal carved hardstones as volume II of hisTraité des pierres gravées.

Louis XIV, an acquisitive connoisseur, brought together the cabinet of curiosities of his uncle Gaston, Duke of Orléans and acquired that of Hippolyte de Béthune, the nephew of Henry IV's minister Maximilien de Béthune, Duke of Sully. In order to keep the collections closer at hand, he removed them from the old royal library in Paris to the Palace of Versailles.

When Louis' great-grandson Louis XV had attained majority, the Cabinet was returned to Paris in 1724, to take up its present space in the royal library that was designed under the direction of Jules-Robert de Cotte, the son of Jules Hardouin-Mansart's successor at the Bâtiments du Roi. In the Cabinet des Médailles, the medal-cabinet delivered in 1739 by the ébéniste du roi Antoine Gaudreau figures among the greatest pieces of French furniture. Other medal cabinets were delivered for Louis XIV by André-Charles Boulle. The cabinet also still houses its paintings by François Boucher, Charles Joseph Natoire and Charles-André van Loo.

Following the French Revolution, a number of precious objects previously kept at the Treasury of Saint-Denis joined the collection of the Cabinet.

The Cabinet des Médailles is considered the oldest museum in France. It is located in the former building of the Bibliothèque Nationale, 58 rue Richelieu, Paris II.

== Significant objects ==
- Throne of Dagobert
- Charlemagne chessmen
- Berthouville Treasure
- Cup of the Ptolemies
- Great Cameo of France
- Treasure of Gourdon
- Cameo with Valerian and Shapur I
- Romanos Ivory
- The type vases for several Ancient Greek vase painters, including the Amykos Painter, Class of Cabinet des Médailles 218, the Arkesilas Cup of the Arkesilas Painter.
- The Idalion Tablet
- Nazareth Inscription
- Baal Lebanon inscription

== See also ==
- List of numismatic collections
- List of museums in Paris
