= Naucratis Painter =

Ancient Greek vase painter

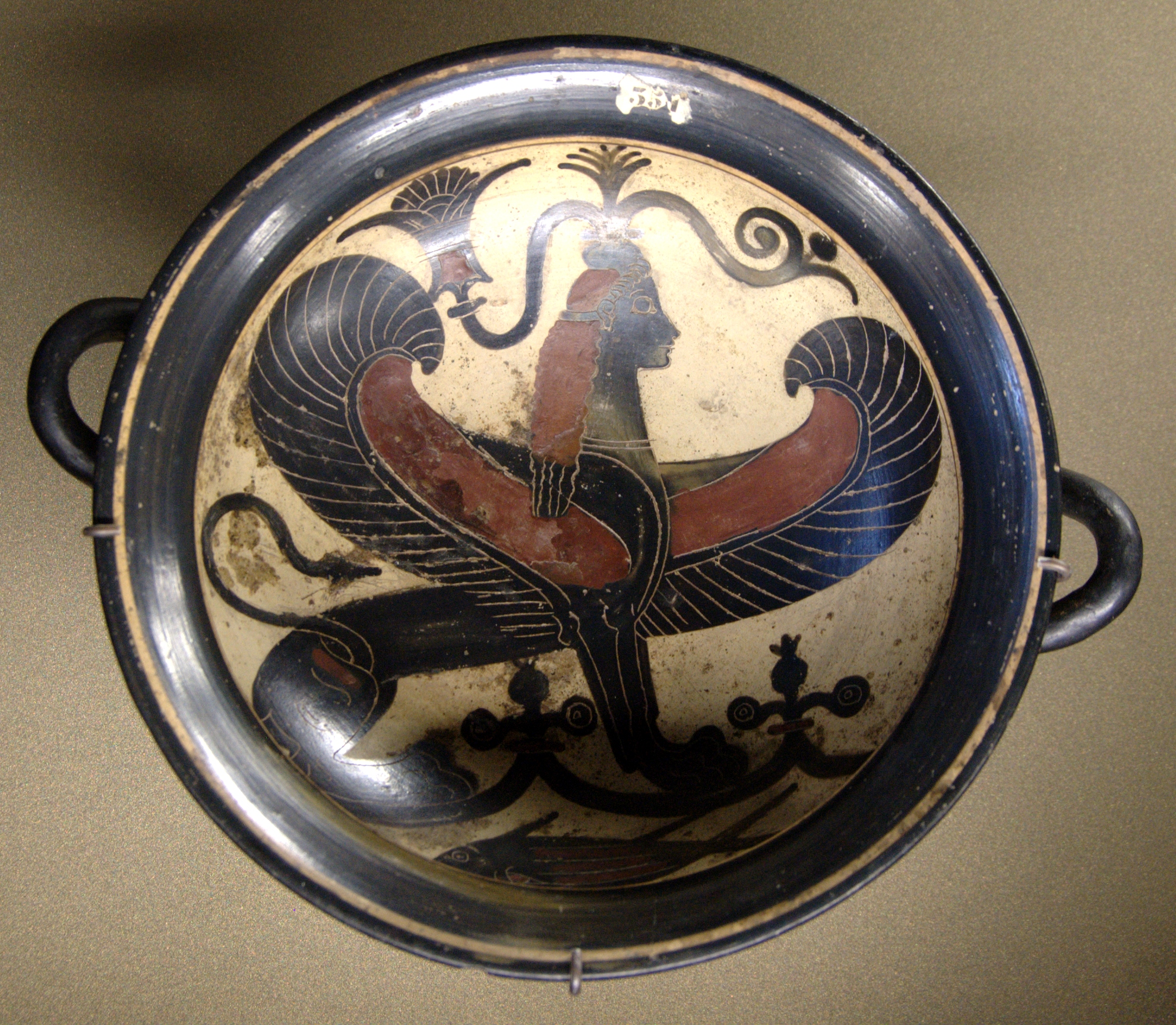
Sphinx. Tondo from a Laconian black-figure cup by the Naucratis Painter, ca. 570 BC, Louvre

The Naucratis Painter was a Laconian vase painter of the mid-sixth century BC. Naucratis was a Greek trading post (emporion) in Egypt. Two fragments of a kylix found in the Demeter Sanctuary, Cyrene, show that the Naucratis Painter was literate, and the form of a three-stroke iota suggests, moreover, that he was a foreigner in Laconia.

== See also ==
- Corpus vasorum antiquorum
