= Edward Arthur Lane =

- Born: December 15, 1909
- Died: March 7, 1963 (aged 53)
- Education: St John's College, Cambridge
- Occupations: Archaeologist, Ceramics Specialist
- Employer(s): Victoria and Albert Museum
- Known for: Contributions to ceramics and archaeology
- Notable work: Laconian Vase Painting, Early Islamic Pottery, Later Islamic Pottery

Edward Arthur Lane (15 December 1909 – 7 March 1963) also known as Arthur Lane and E.A. Lane was an English classical archaeologist and ceramics specialist.

After attending St. John's School in Leatherhead, Arthur Lane studied classics at St John's College (Cambridge). In 1932 he attended the British School at Athens on a scholarship and, based on the work of its then director Humfry Payne, he wrote a fundamental work on Laconian vase painting. Since 1934 he worked in the Department of Ceramics at the Victoria and Albert Museum in London and was head of this department from 1950 to 1963. In 1937 he took part in Leonard Woolley's excavation at Al Mina, where his interest in Islamic ceramics was awakened. He wrote his most important works in this area, but also wrote about numerous other areas of ceramics.

== Publications (selection) ==
- Laconian Vase Painting. In: The Annual of the British School at Athens. Volume 34, 1933/1934, pp. 99–189.
- A Guide to the Collection of Tiles. London 1939.
- Glazed Relief Ware of the Ninth Century A.D. In: Ars Islamica. Volume 4, 1939, pp. 56–65.
- Early Islamic Pottery: Mesopotamia, Egypt and Persia. London 1947.
- French faïence. London 1946.
- Greek Pottery. London 1948.
- Style in Pottery. London 1948.
- Italian porcelain. London 1954.
- Later Islamic Pottery: Persia, Syria, Egypt, Turkey. London 1957
- 2nd ed. 1971 by Ralph H. Pinder-Wilson, Faber & Faber, London. ISBN 0-571-04736-X
- English Porcelain Figures of the Eighteenth Century. London 1961.
