= Name vase =

Archaeological classification

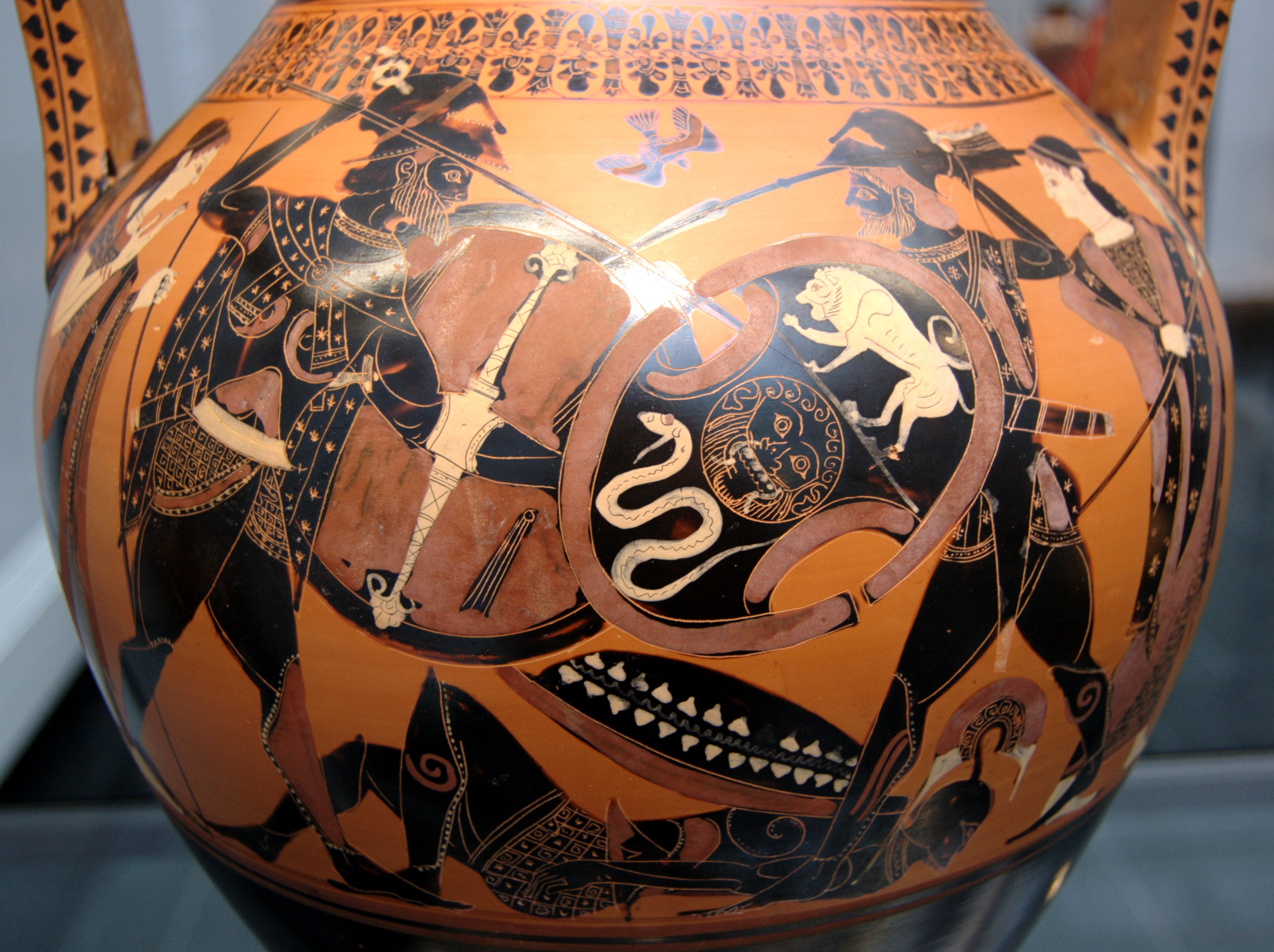
Vase Munich 1410 (Munich, Staatliche Antikensammlungen, is the name vase for the Painter of Munich 1410.

In classical archaeology, a name vase is a specific "vase" whose painter's name is unknown but whose workshop style has been identified. The painter is conventionally named after the selected "name vase" that embodies their characteristic style, or for one of its distinctive painted subjects, or for other attributes.

The allocation of such names is necessary because the majority of ancient Greek and South Italian vase painters did not sign their works. For discussion and analysis of the work and career of individual artists conventional names were needed in order to designate them. The name can refer to a vase's motif (the Meleager Painter), former owner (the Shuvalov Painter), present location (the Baltimore Painter), find location (the Dipylon Master), inscription, habitual potter (the Kleophrades Painter), shape, and so on. For Athenian vases, the majority of such names were introduced by John D. Beazley, the first scholar to study them systematically; for South Italian vases, Arthur Dale Trendall played a similar role.

Important painters given a sobriquet based on a name vase include for example the Painter of Berlin A 34, the Nessos Painter, the Andokides Painter, the Antimenes Painter, the Antiphon Painter, the Berlin Painter, the Bryn Mawr Painter, and the Pistoxenos Painter.
