= Amphora of Hermonax in Würzburg =

Ancient neck amphora

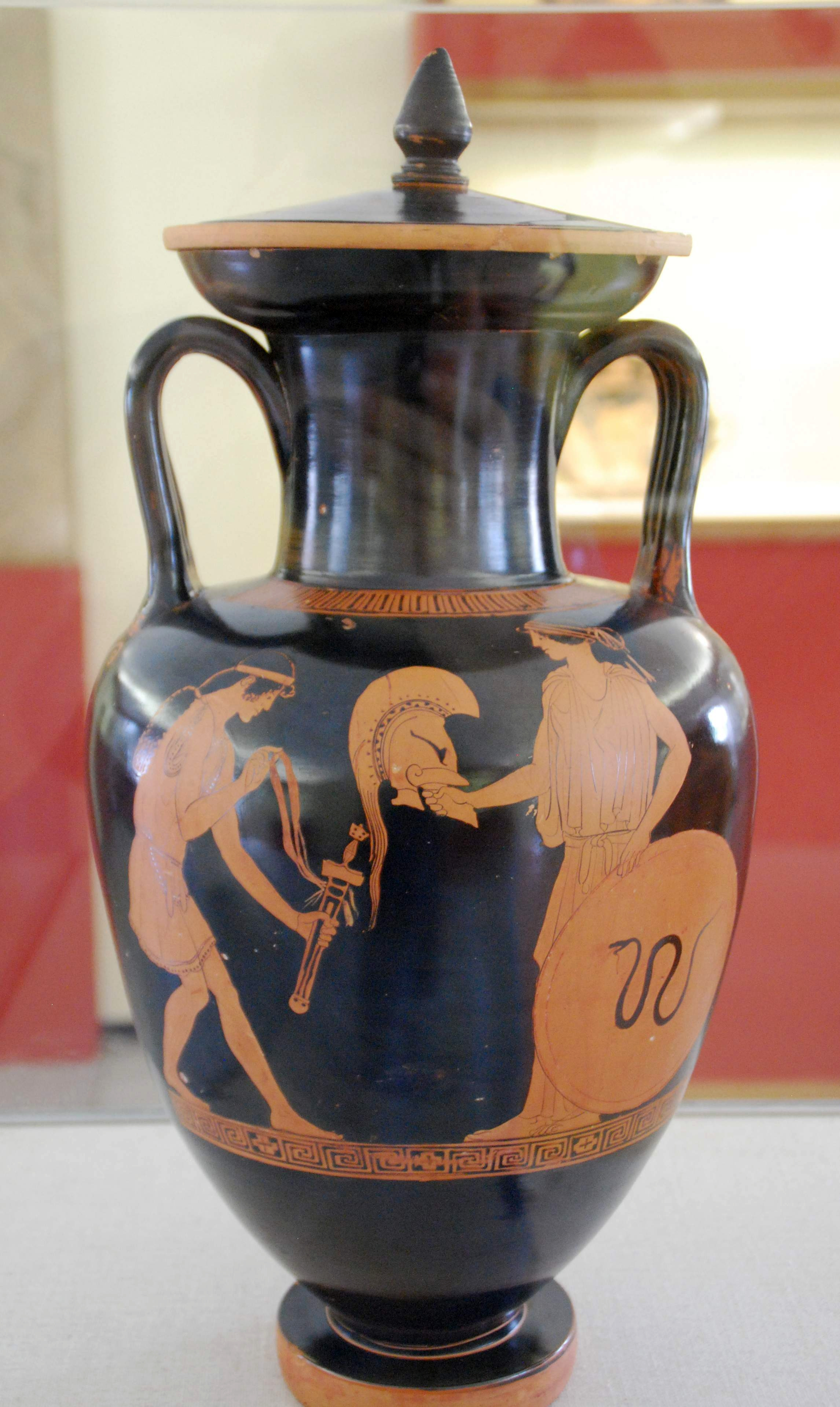
Front side with the arming scene

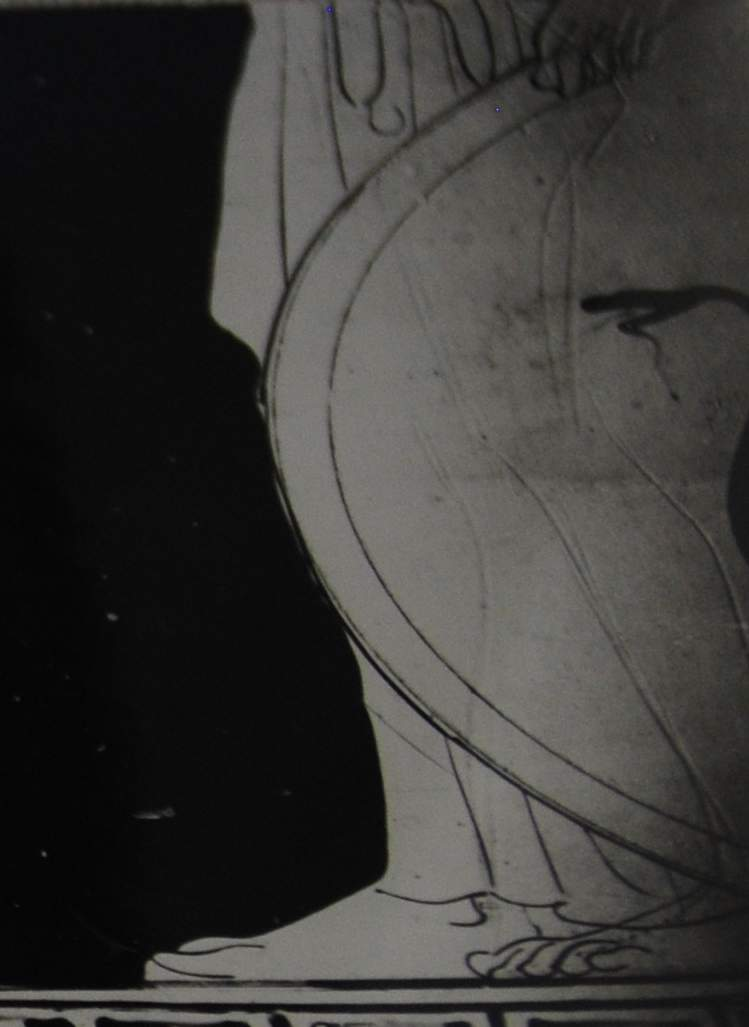
Detail with the preliminary sketching visible underneath the shield

The Amphora of Hermonax in Würzburg is a neck amphora which was made by the early classical Attic vase painter Hermonax in the red figure style of Greek vase painting around 450 BC. The amphora was found in an Etruscan grave in Vulci. Originally kept in the Feoli collection, it now belongs to the antiquity collection of the Martin von Wagner Museum in Würzburg, where it is on display with a lid which probably does not belong to it.

== Description ==
Both the execution of the potter's work and the imagery are typical for vases of this period. There are hundreds of slight variations of the theme of the arming scene depicted on the amphora. However, the painting on this amphora, which was attributed to Hermonax by John Beazley, is of a higher quality than most depictions of this theme.

On the front there is a young woman, who helps a young man to arm himself. Both wear only a chiton; normally the young man would also have a two-part shirt and skirt. While the young man stoops slightly to put on his sword (though it was normal to put the greaves on first), the woman passes him his helmet, which has moveable cheek-plates and face plate. She also hold his round shield, which has the emblem of a snake on it as an emblem. Body armour, greaves, and spear are absent. Since the Persian Wars, the items were common for Athenian hoplites. Although at the time when the vase was created the Athenian fleet was acquiring an ever more significant part in Athenian warfare, the hoplite remained the ideal citizen in arms and was depicted in an idealised form for a long time. Also, long hair was no longer in fashion at the time of the creation of the vase and referred back to the Late Archaic, heroic period of the Persian Wars.

== Interpretation ==
There are two theories about who is depicted here. On the one hand, it has been suggested that the young man is Achilles receiving from his mother Thetis the weapons made by Hephaestus during the Trojan War and that the image derives from a scene in book 19 of Homer's Iliad. A detail of this vase supports this theory: under the shield there are several lines from the vase painter's preliminary sketches. These sketches were engraved in the half dried clay before the firing in the slip with which it was covered before being fired. In these it can be seen that the female figure was originally intended to be naked. Generally, the only women who were depicted naked in Greek art were goddesses, mythological figures like Maenads or Nymphs, and prostitutes.

A second theory sees the young man, in Athenian custom at this age probably not yet married, simply as a Greek warrior, preparing for a campaign. Such a scene could only be set in a domestic environment. The woman depicted in the scene is too young to be his mother, so she must therefore be the young man's sister. Possibly a distinction has been consciously created by Hermonax between the divine and human spheres. Another factor in favour of the second theory is the fact that the people and the weapons look very dainty and hardly divine.

The reverse of the vase shows a man with a spear in the process of leaving, receiving a patera from a woman who fills it from a jug. This might signify the religious aspect of the departure to war, the departure offering.

== Bibliography ==
- John Beazley. Attic Red-Figure Vase-Painters. 2nd edition, Clarendon Press, Oxford 1963, p. 487 No. 55.
- Irma Wehgartner. "Auszug eines jungen Kriegers," In Ulrich Sinn, Irma Wehgartner (Edd.): Begegnung mit der Antike. Zeugnisse aus vier Jahrtausenden mittelmeerischer Kultur im Südflügel der Würzburger Residenz, Ergon, Würzburg 2001, ISBN 3-935556-72-1, pp. 90–91.
