= Brygos cup of Würzburg =

The Brygos Cup of Würzburg (de: Würzburger Brygosschale) is an Attic red-figure kylix from about 480 BC. It was made by the Brygos potter and painted by the man known as the Brygos Painter. It depicts some of the best-known images of ancient Greek pottery.

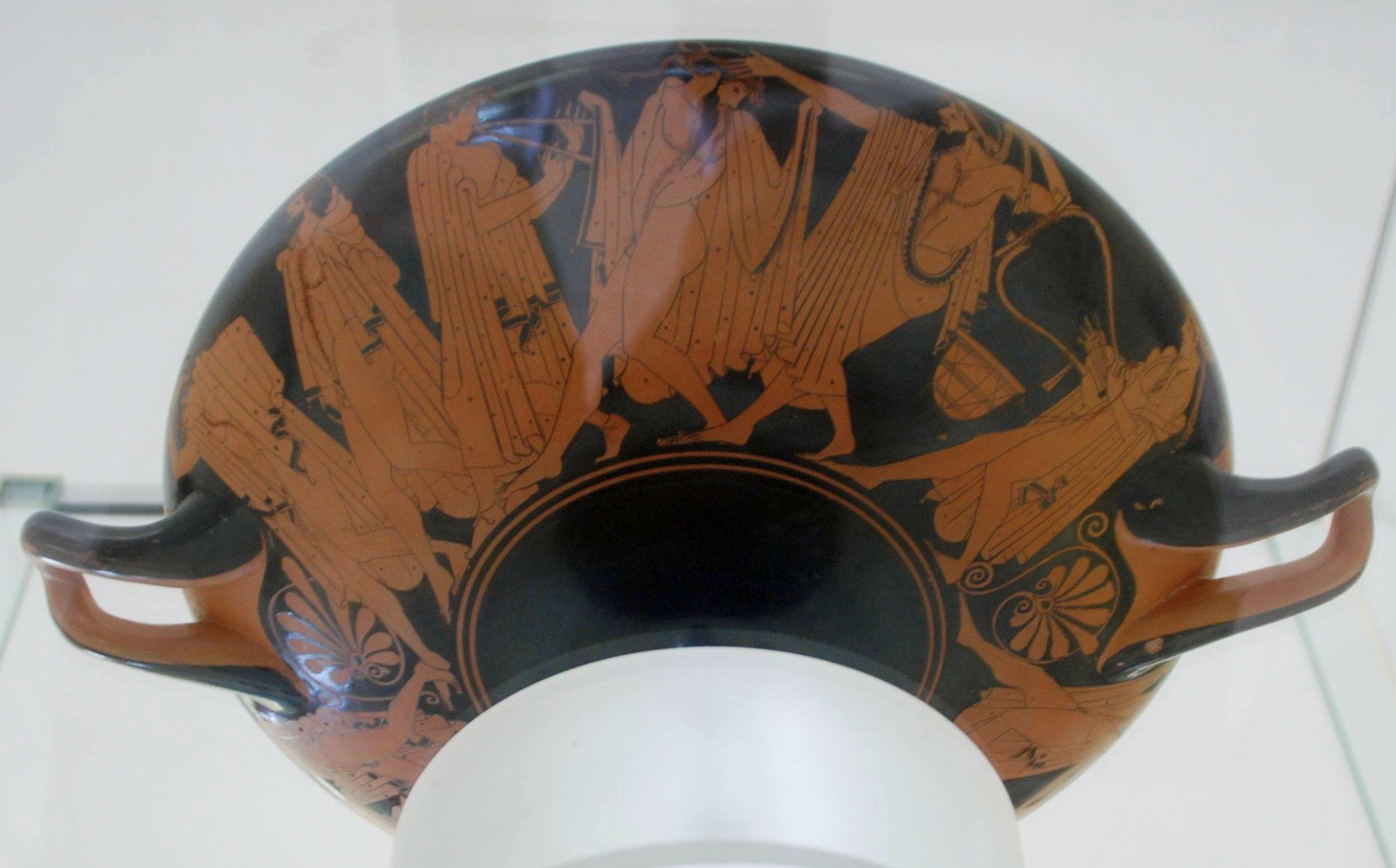
Exterior of the Brygos cup of Würzburg: Komasts on the move, barbiton player at left, aulos player at middle right

Apart from a fracture on the base of the cup, the kylix remains intact. It is a kylix, a particularly successful example of Type B of the more than a hundred forms of Attic pottery cups. The contours of the vessel are perfectly worked from lip to foot. On the untreated clay inside of the left handle, the potter Brygos has left his signature in dainty letters: ΒΡΥΓΟΣ ΕΠΟΙΕΣΕΝ (Brygos made this). In the scholarship it is controversial as to whether it was personally produced by the Brygos painter and the Brygos potter. The painter was identified with the notname Brygos Painter by John Beazley, who also argued that the potter of the Würzburg cup was one of very great ability. The cup is 14 centimetres high and has a diameter of 32.2 centimetres. It once belonged to the Feoli collection, but today is in the Martin von Wagner Museum in Würzburg, where it has the inventory number HA 428 (= L 479).

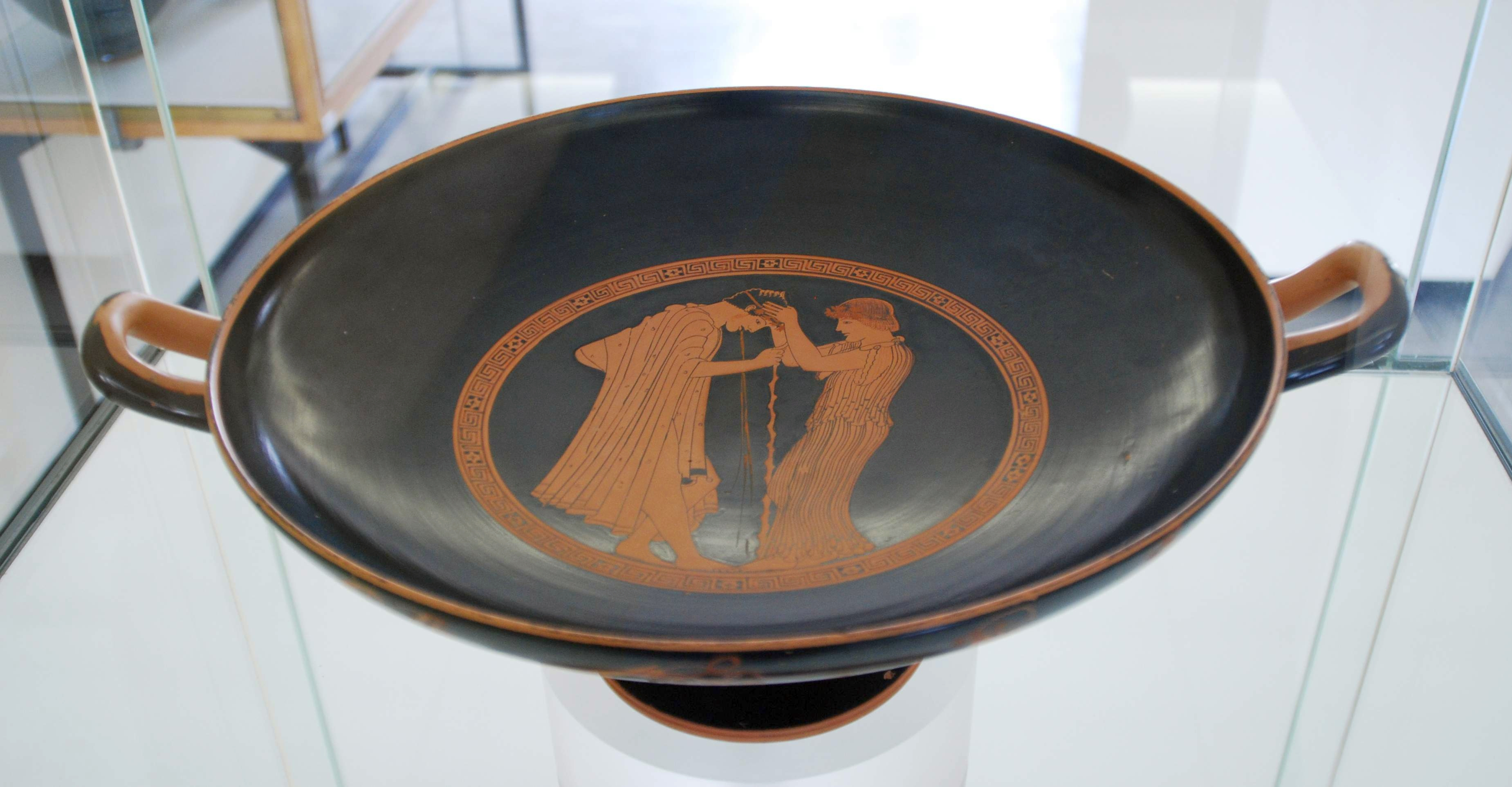
Interior with vomiting scene

The image in the bowl (tondo) shows a young participant at a symposium who is vomiting as a result of overindulgence. A blonde woman helpfully and carefully holds his head. Because only prostitutes were generally present at such parties, she should also be a hetaira. Both are depicted wearing garlands. The young man supports himself with his walking stick, which is the symbol of leisure. Probably he is a young aristocrat. The image is surrounded by a meander.

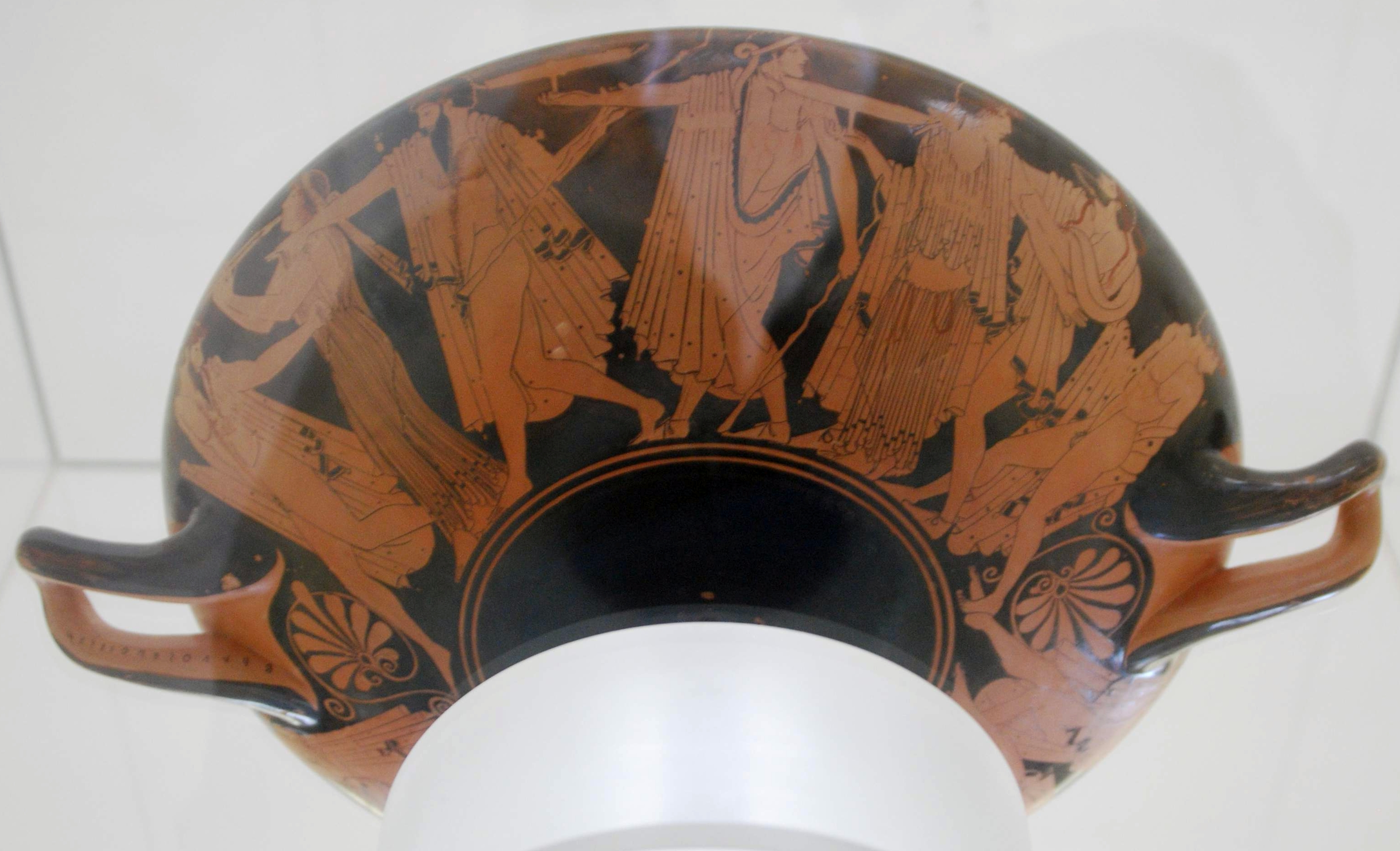
Exterior of the Brygos cup of Würzburg: Komasts on the move

The exterior shows a procession of revelers (komos), the boisterous event which occurred at the end of a symposion. The komasts are largely naked, dressed in only a chlamys (cloak), and are crowned with grape vines. The cloaks are depicted with the scattered dots which are typical of the Brygos painter. One of the revelers plays the aulos (a double flute), another plays the barbiton (a type of lyre). The participants in the procession head off with bouncy steps. A few details, such as their headbands and vine wreaths are painted in the same red as their skin. the tondo image and the barbiton player are images which were often reproduced in the literary tradition and other media.

== Bibliography ==
- Irma Wehgartner. "Die „Brygosschale“", in Ulrich Sinn, Irma Wehgartner (ed.s): Begegnung mit der Antike. Zeugnisse aus vier Jahrtausenden mittelmeerischer Kultur im Südflügel der Würzburger Residenz. Ergon, Würzburg 2001, ISBN 3-935556-72-1, S. 76–77.
