= Mamarce Oinochoe =

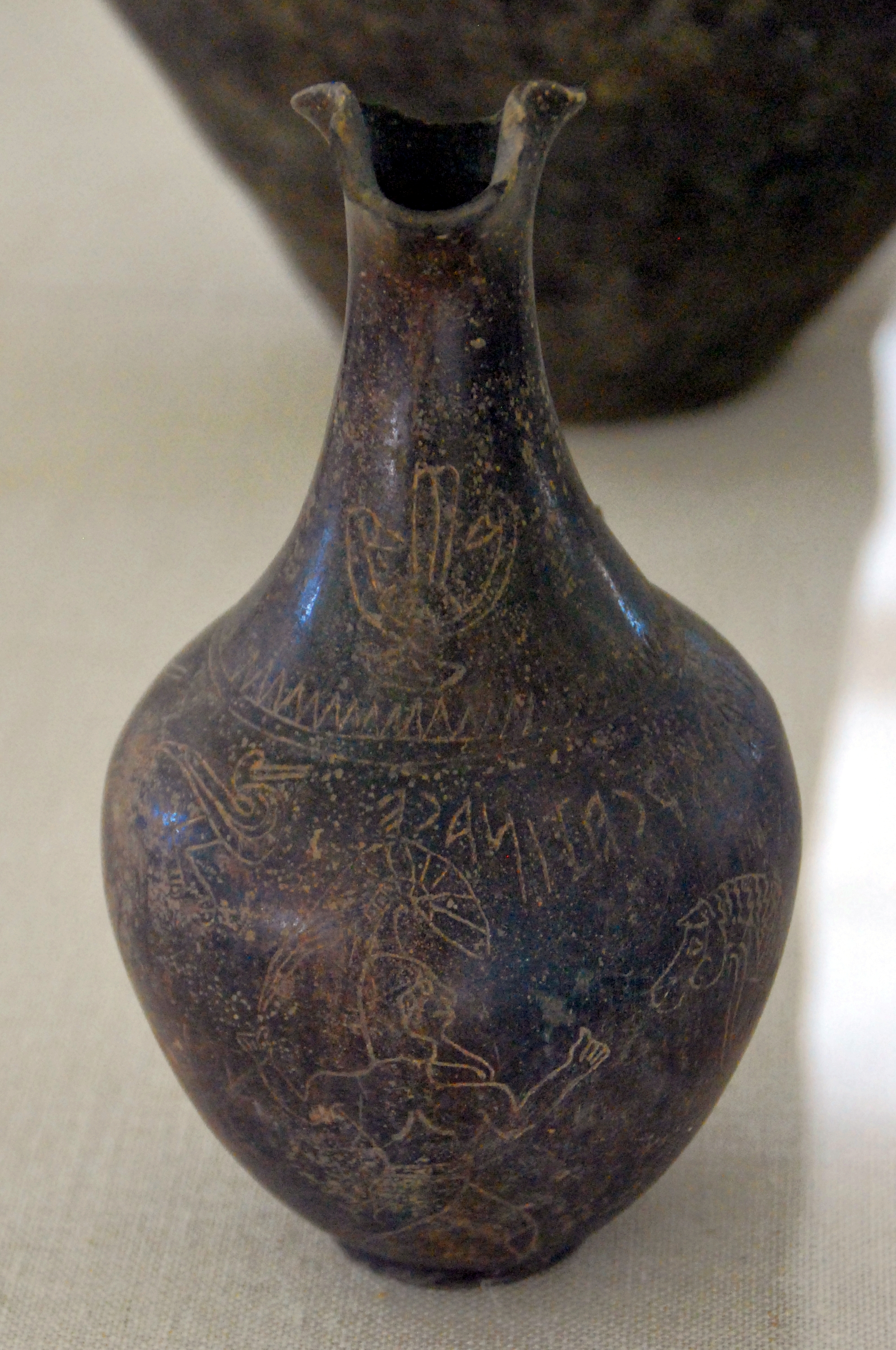
Mamarce Oinochoe, Würzburg

The Mamarce Oinochoe is an Etruscan vessel of art historical significance which is dated to around 640/20 BC. Today the oinochoe is kept in Martin von Wagner Museum in Würzburg, where it has the inventory number H 5724.

== Description and style ==
Not including the handle, it has a height of 20.5 centimetres and a maximum diameter of 11.6 centimetres. The spout of the vessel widens slightly from the concave neck. Features such as its trefoil mouth, truncated column neck, pear-shaped body, low disk-shaped foot and strap handle indicate a fairly advanced stage of development, on which account it should be dated to the second or third quarter of the seventh century, probably between 640 and 620.

In many respects, the Oinochoe of the Mamarce potter combines several cultural traditions together. Firstly, the vessel is a work in the impasto style which was typical of the Villanova culture. As was the norm, very fine-grained clay was used and it was turned on a potter's wheel, not just moulded by hand. The surface was polished in the manner of prehistoric art. The shape is known among scholars as bucchero impasto and prefigures later Bucchero pottery. Thus, the oinochoe stands in the transition between the Villanova culture and that of the Etruscans.

== Imagery and motifs ==
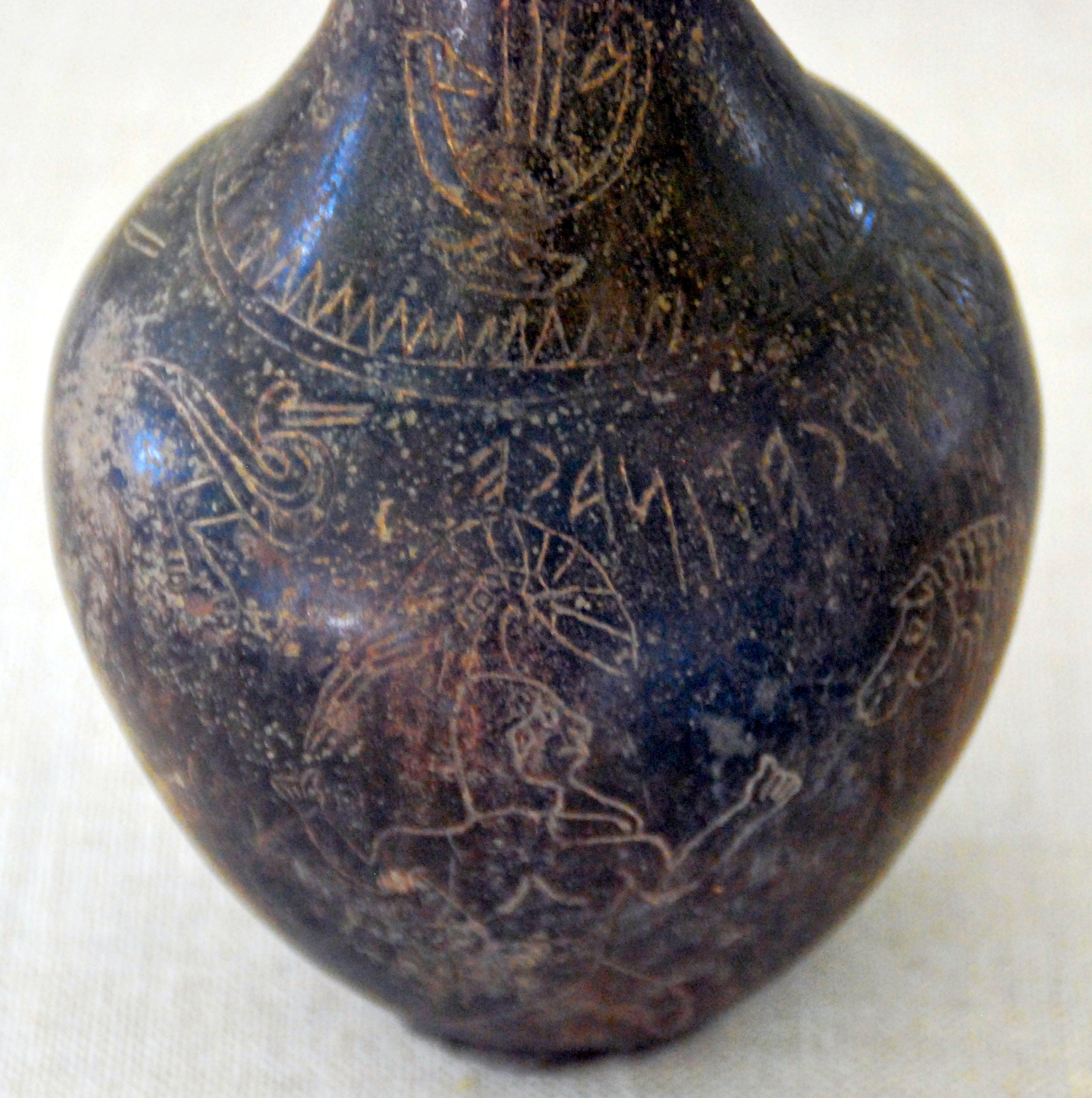
Incised decoration of the oinochoe

Images were incised on the oinochoe and red filling was pressed into the incisions, some traces of which still remain. This incised decoration suggests the oinochoe comes from the Falisci or Falerii area, but it might also come from the neighbouring settlement of Veii. The incisions depict a warrior who is flanked by a horse on the right and by a goat suckling its kid on the left (both goats missing their fourth leg). Above the goats there were two waterfowl. The engraver equipped the bearded warrior with helmet, greaves and belt and depicted him with his legs spread as if he were dancing.

The depiction of a human figure flanked by animals has a parallel in the common eastern motif of the master of animals. While the master of animals motif originates in the east, it is common in Greece; a form with horses is native to Corinth and goats might indicate Euboean influence. If the image derives from the master of animals motif, then the depiction of a suckling goat is most unusual - we would expect two horses. Even more unusual is the fact that the goat is looking away from the warrior. The waterfowl would have to be explained as Villanovan influence.

== Inscription ==
On the right side, stretching over the horse to the warrior is an incised inscription in Etruscan which reads from right to left, saying mi mamarce zinace. Mi is the first person singular nominative pronoun, mamarce is a male name in the nominative-accusative or locative case and zinace is a past active verb meaning "made". Because Mamarce only states his first name, it is assumed that he belonged to a lower social class. The name Mamerce is Italic, appearing in Latin as Mamercus and connected with Mamers, the Oscan name of the god Mars. That the potter who bore this name was himself ethnically Italiote need not follow.

== Bibliography ==
- Irma Wehgartner. Corpus Vasorum Antiquorum Würzburg 3. Beck, München 1983 ISBN 3-406-09751-0. 3.4,1.
- Irma Wehgartner. Mi Mamarce Zinace in Ulrich Sinn, Irma Wehgartner (ed.s): Begegnung mit der Antike. Zeugnisse aus vier Jahrtausenden mittelmeerischer Kultur im Südflügel der Würzburger Residenz, Ergon, Würzburg 2001 ISBN 3-935556-72-1, p. 8–9
- Giovannangelo Camporeale. Mamarce. in Rainer Vollkommer (ed.), Künstlerlexikon der Antike. Nikol, Hamburg 2007, p. 485.
