= Feoli collection =

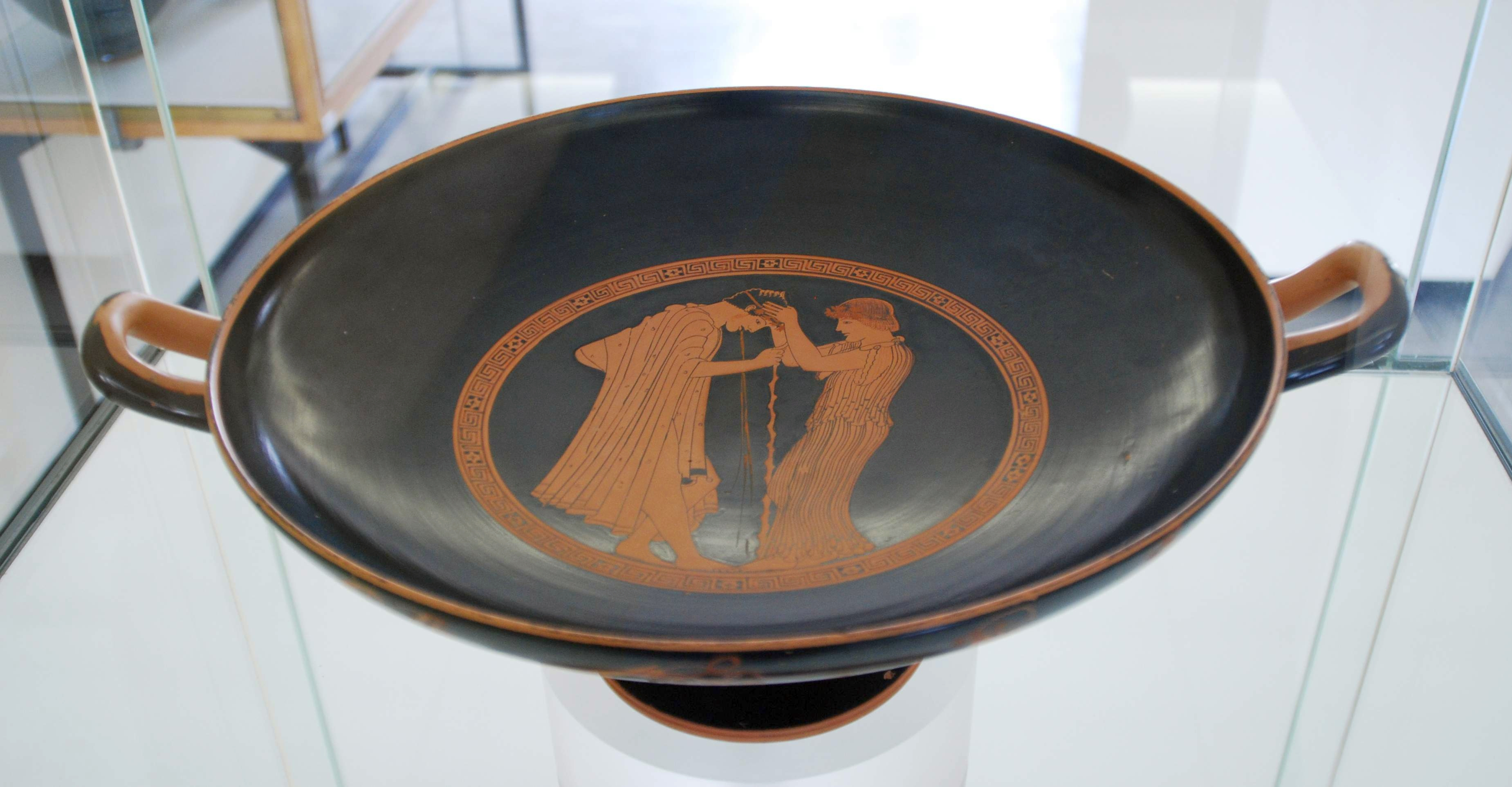
Attic kylix signed by the potter Brygos, painted by the Brygos painter, c. 480 BC; Tondo: a young symposion guest throws up; his head is held by a blonde hetaira.

The Feoli collection (German: Sammlung Feoli) is a formerly private collection of ancient art, which is now mostly part of the antiquities collection of the Martin von Wagner Museum in the south wing of the Würzburg Residenz.

Agostino Feoli owned an estate which was located in the area of the necropoleis of the ancient Etruscan city of Vulci and carried out several excavations on his lands - like many other estate owners. He carried out two very successful campaigns, one from 1829 to 1831 and another from 1846 to 1847. Unlike most other such excavators, he did not sell many of his finds, but kept them for a personal collection which is still called the Feoli collection in honour of him.

The collection was initially publicised by Eduard Gerhard in his Rapporto Vulcente and was published in 1837 by Secondiamo Campanari in his catalogue, Antichi vasi dipinti della collezione Feoli (Ancient Painted Vases of the Feoli Collection). Feoli sold some pieces, but he traded and bought new pieces in his later years. As a result the source of the pieces in the collection which did not appear in the 1837 catalogue is not certain. After this, the collection was considered lost at times. Heinrich Brunn found it in 1865 in Rome and returned it to academic attention.

Feoli's heirs had managed to gather the collection together immediately after Feoli's death, but in 1872 they had a financial crisis and had to sell the collection quickly for whatever they could get for it. The classicist Ludwig von Urlichs of the University of Würzburg took note, using Wolfgang Helbig, who was in Rome during Easter 1872, as a mediator. With the help of the then newly invented telegraph, he transmitted the information to Bavaria and quickly convinced the Bavarian ministry of culture, minister Johann von Lutz and the university administration to act in order to acquire the collection for the Wurzberg collection, using the income from a forthcoming exhibition of the art-collector and painter Johann Martin von Wagner. It was more difficult to convince the university senate. It held a vote and decided that the acquisition was unnecessary, since they had already acquired a pretty substantial collection from the bequest of Wagner and some subsequent purchases. Other critics complained that there was no obvious place for storing and displaying the collection. In fact, it was originally planned that a new museum would be built with the reserves which had built up from the profits from the Wagner bequest. According to later accounts, the crucial meeting, at which the decision about the funding was to be decided, was held on a very hot and humid afternoon in the semester break. It is said that it was only thanks to a speech by Felix Dahn that the senate agreed to the speech and the money necessary to purchase the last great private collection of antiquities in Italy was made available. On 7 May 1872 the collection was bought by the university at a cost of 26,500 lire. The purchase of the collection had initially been partially funded by Urlich through the sale of securities from his wife's dowry - an act which she resented for the rest of her life. The transport of the collection to Wurzberg was overseen by Urlichs and his student Adam Flasch. By the end of the year, Urlichs had put the collection on display and also published a catalogue of the collection. It was the last large acquisition of the Würzburg Museum for over twenty years.

With the acquisition of the Feoli collection, the Martin Wagner Museum gained about 480 new antiquities at once, mostly dating from between 530 and 480 BC and consisting primarily of Greek vases, but also Etruscan ones. Today the Feoli collection is the heart of the Wurzberg collection of ancient pottery, which is the third largest in Germany after the Antikensammlung Berlin and the Staatliche Antikensammlungen in Munich. The Etruscan Feoli painter was given his notname for a vase in the Feoli collection by John Beazley.

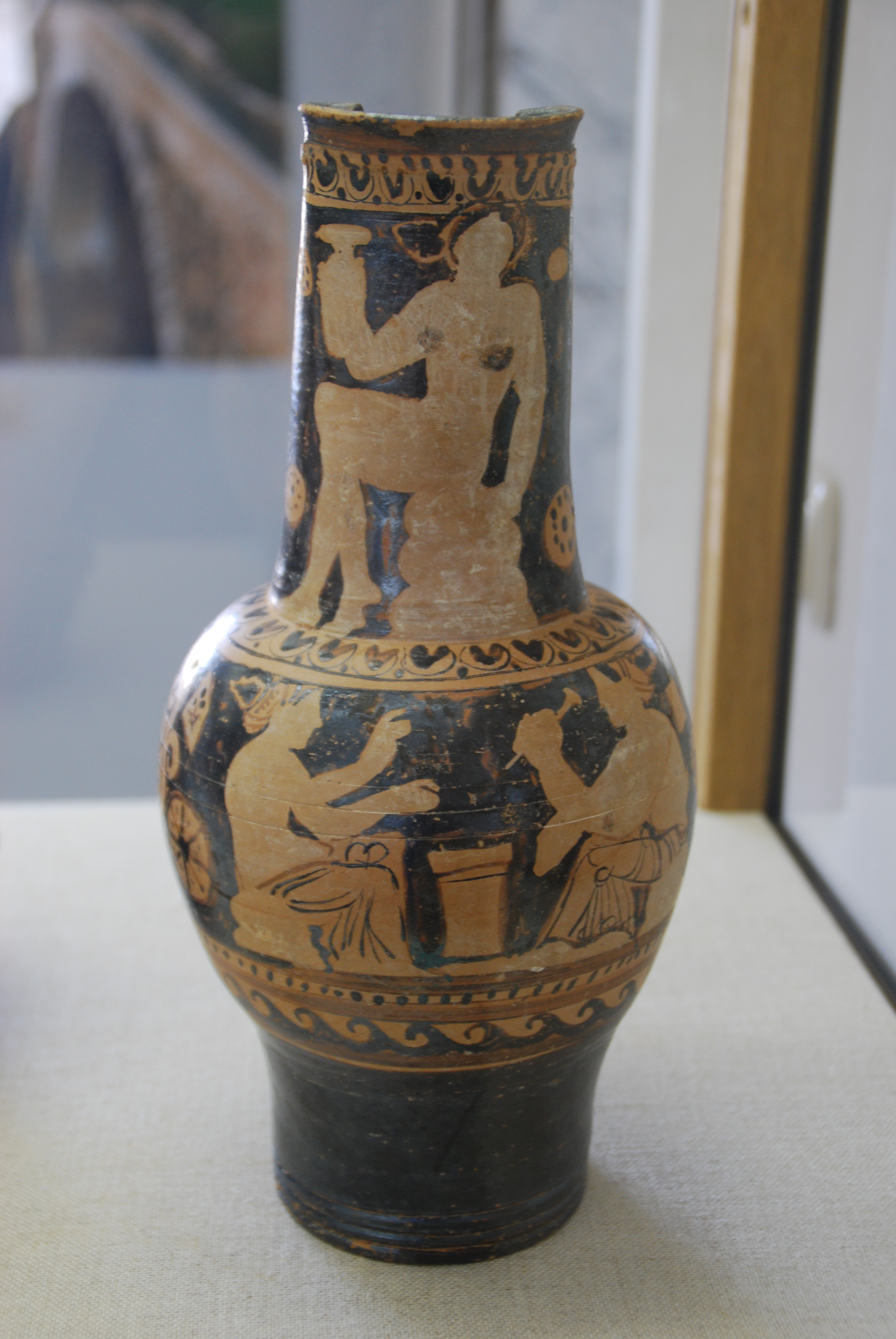
Etruscan red figure Schnabelkanne; belly image: two women weaving; neck image: naked woman with alabastron in her hand sitting on a rock; c.350/325 BC.

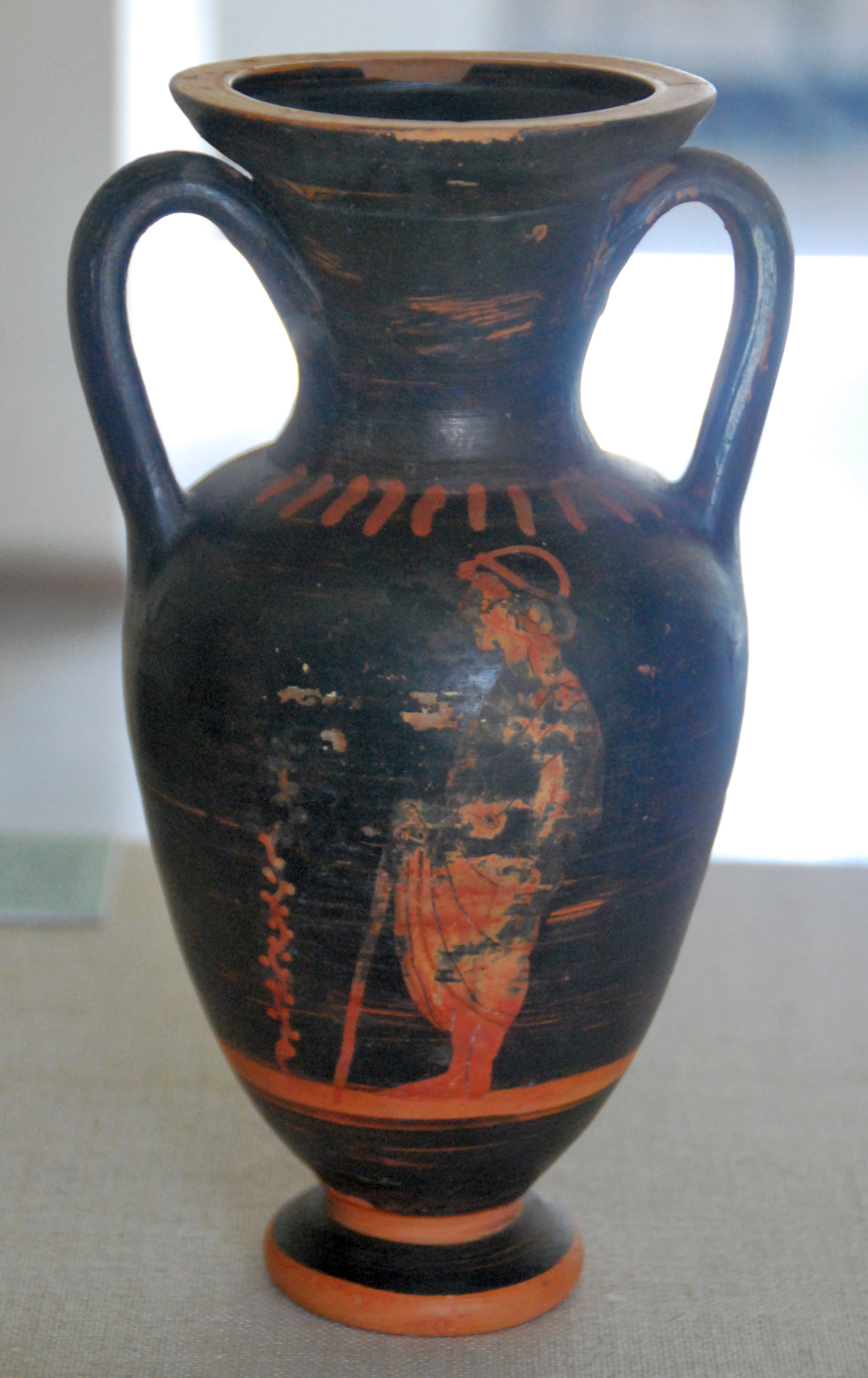
Etruscan pseudo red figure amphora from the Praxias group, which probably had their workshop in Vulci; draped youths on both sides; c.480/50 BC.

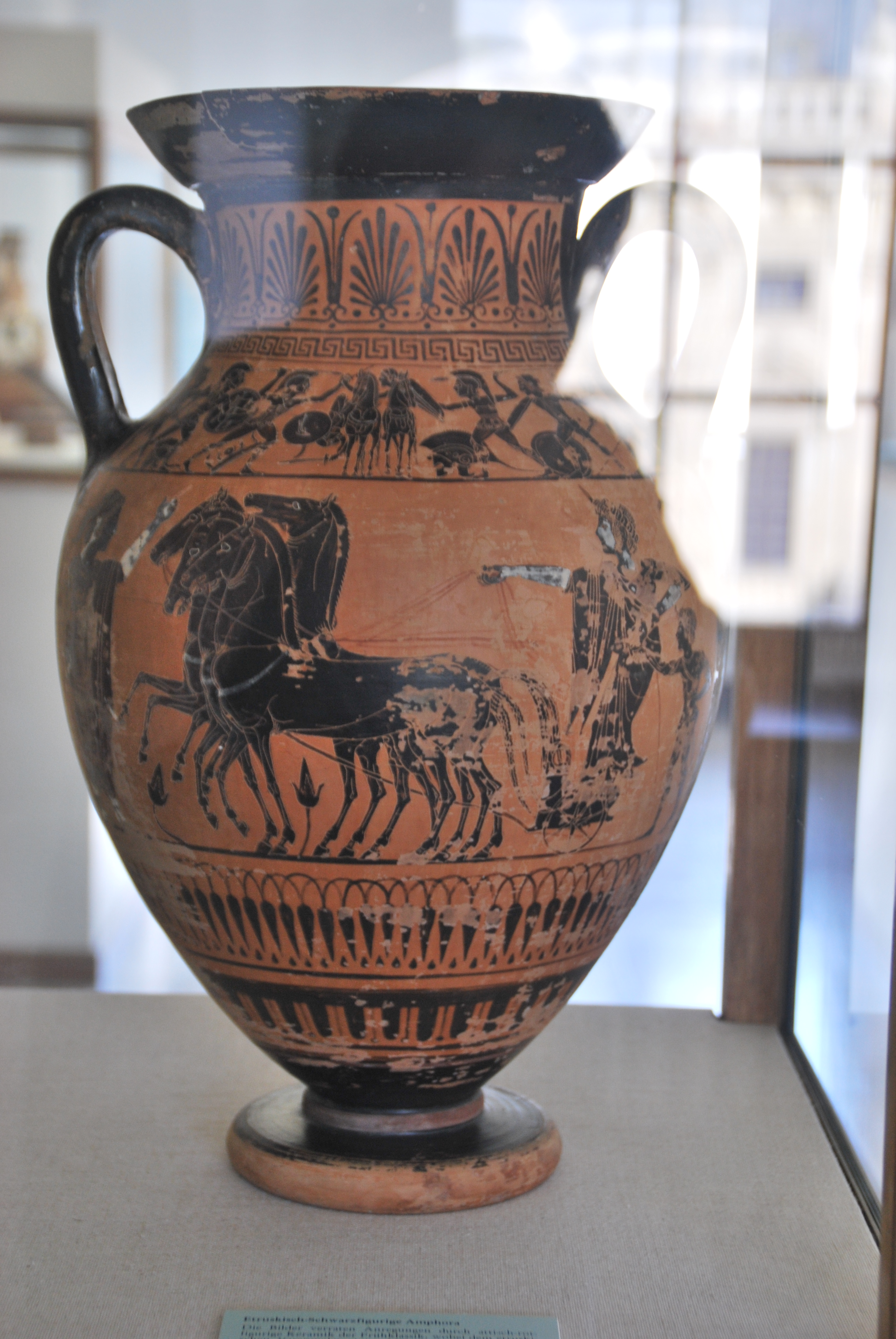
Etruscan black figure amphora; belly image: Athena in a quadriga; shoulder image: Aphrodite (in Etruscan, Turan), depicted with wings, holds her cloak over Aeneas; c. 470 BC.

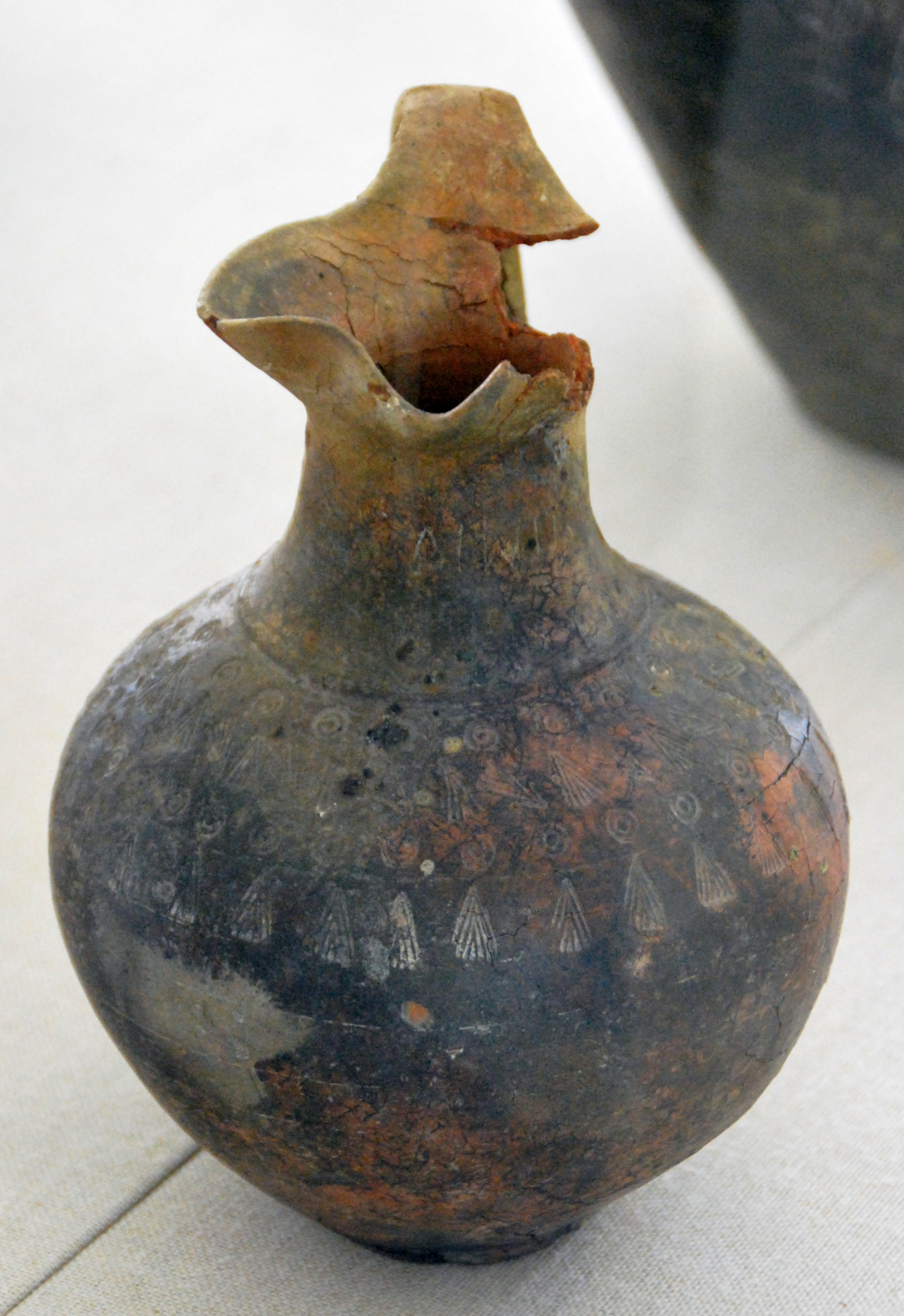
Etruscan impasto vase with an engraved inscription in Greek letters, mae by its owner MI HUSTILEIA; c. 700675 BC; damaged in 1945 by fire.

== Bibliography ==
- Guntram Beckel, Heide Froning, Erika Simon: Werke der Antike im Martin-von-Wagner-Museum der Universität Würzburg. von Zabern, Mainz 1983, ISBN 3-8053-0768-3 (book) und ISBN 3-8053-0773-X (exhibition), pp. 12–13
- Ulrich Sinn, Irma Wehgartner: Begegnungen mit der Antike. Zeugnisse aus vier Jahrtausenden mittelmeerischer Kultur im Martin-von-Wagner-Museum der Universität Würzburg. Ergon, Würzburg 2001, ISBN 3-935556-72-1, pp. 12–13
