= Providence Painter =

Unidentified ancient Greek vase painter

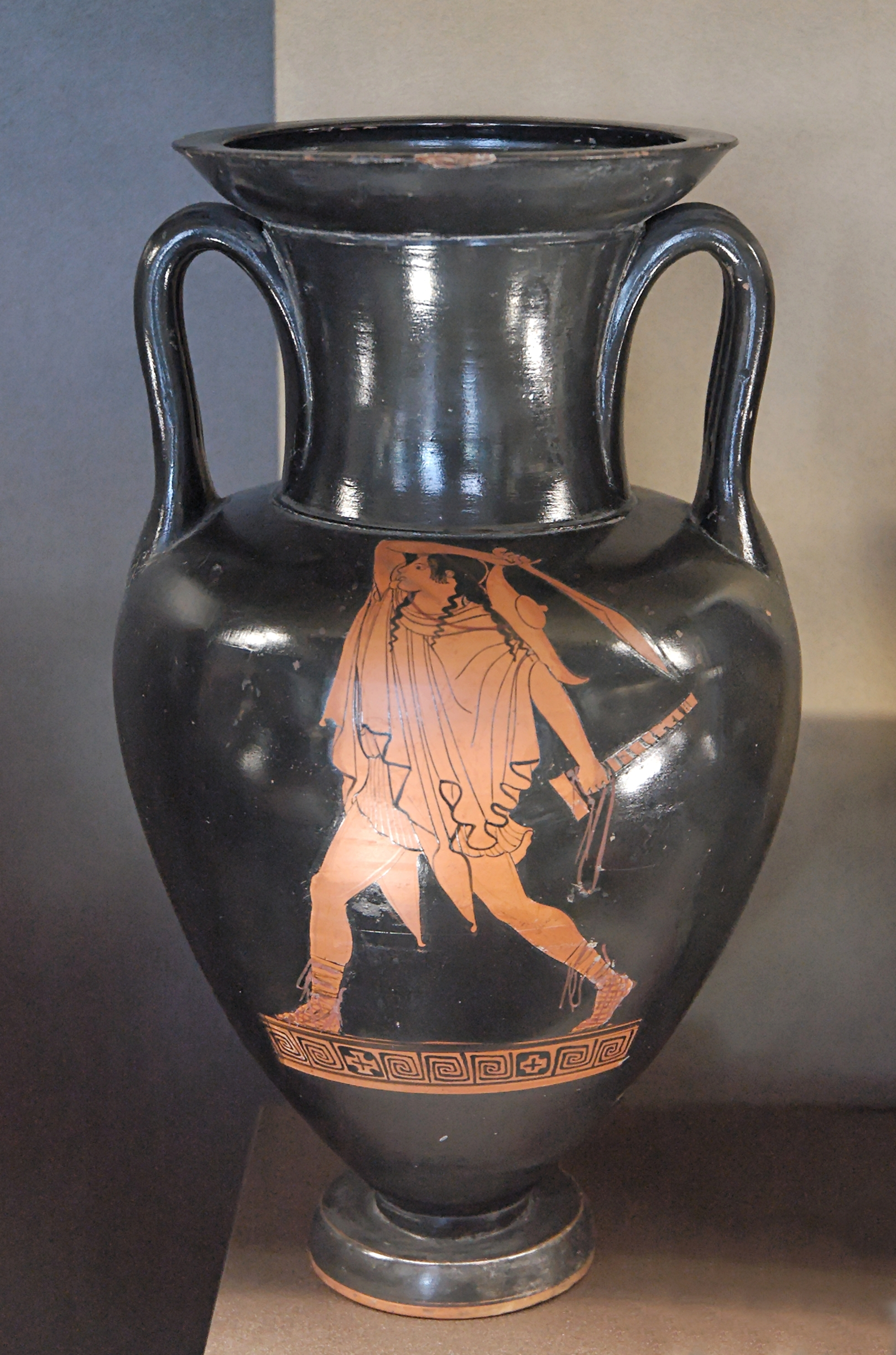
A young man brandishing a sword, neck amphora, circa 470 BC.

The Providence Painter is the conventional name given to a painter of the Attic red-figure style. He was active around 470 BC.

The Providence Painter is considered to have been a pupil of the Berlin Painter. His reputation is that of a careful artist at the transition from Archaic to Classical art. He had difficulties shedding Archaic habits. For example, he tended to faithfully follow Archaic traditions in depicting anatomical detail or clothing. Short narrative scenes are known only from some of his larger vases, such as stamnoi and hydriai depicting groups of deities or mythical events. Usually, however, he painted smaller vases, such as Nolan amphorae or lekythoi. One of his favourite motifs are women under pursuit. Generally, he usually depicts women as running or rushing. He also frequently uses scenes of domestic women, such as weaving. The Providence Painter is often fond of using Athena and Nike (winged woman). Details of his paintings, such as eyes, earrings, ankles or certain plant ornaments are reminiscent of the Berlin Painter. Several of his vases carry a kalos inscription dedicated to Glaukon. The Providence Painter takes his name from a big neck amphora depicting Apollo located in Providence Rhode Island.

Although the Providence painter focused on lekythoi, he did create some amphoras, perhaps because his teacher, the Berlin painter decorated a series of amphoras in his middle period and during this phase the Providence painter learned from the Berlin painter. The Berlin Painter was also the first potter to popularize the use of red-figure on smaller pots, such as the lekthoi, as the Providence Painter has done. The Providence Painter also followed his master with the use of his distinctive symmetrical meander pattern. The Providence Painter mirrored many aspects of the Berlin Painter, suggesting he worked for some time in the Berlin painter’s workshop. But, unlike his master, the Providence painter used white ground with outline drawing on some of his smaller vases, a popular technique of lekythoi pottery.

The Providence painter can also be compared to Hermonax, a red-figure Athens painter active between 470 and 440 BC. Hermonax may have also been in the same workshop as the Berlin and Providence painters, as he shows many similarities. Hermonax is seen as the lesser artist though, as his techniques are not as well executed. For example, he does not draw the meander pattern as well as the Berlin and Providence painters.

== Bibliography ==
- John D. Beazley. Attic Red-Figure Vase-Painters. Oxford: Clarendon Press, 1963.
- John Boardman. Rotfigurige Vasen aus Athen. Die archaische Zeit, Philipp von Zabern, 4th ed., Mainz, 1994 (Kulturgeschichte der Antiken Welt, Vol 4), especially p. 149-151, ISBN 3-8053-0234-7
