= Hermonax =

Ancient Greek vase painter

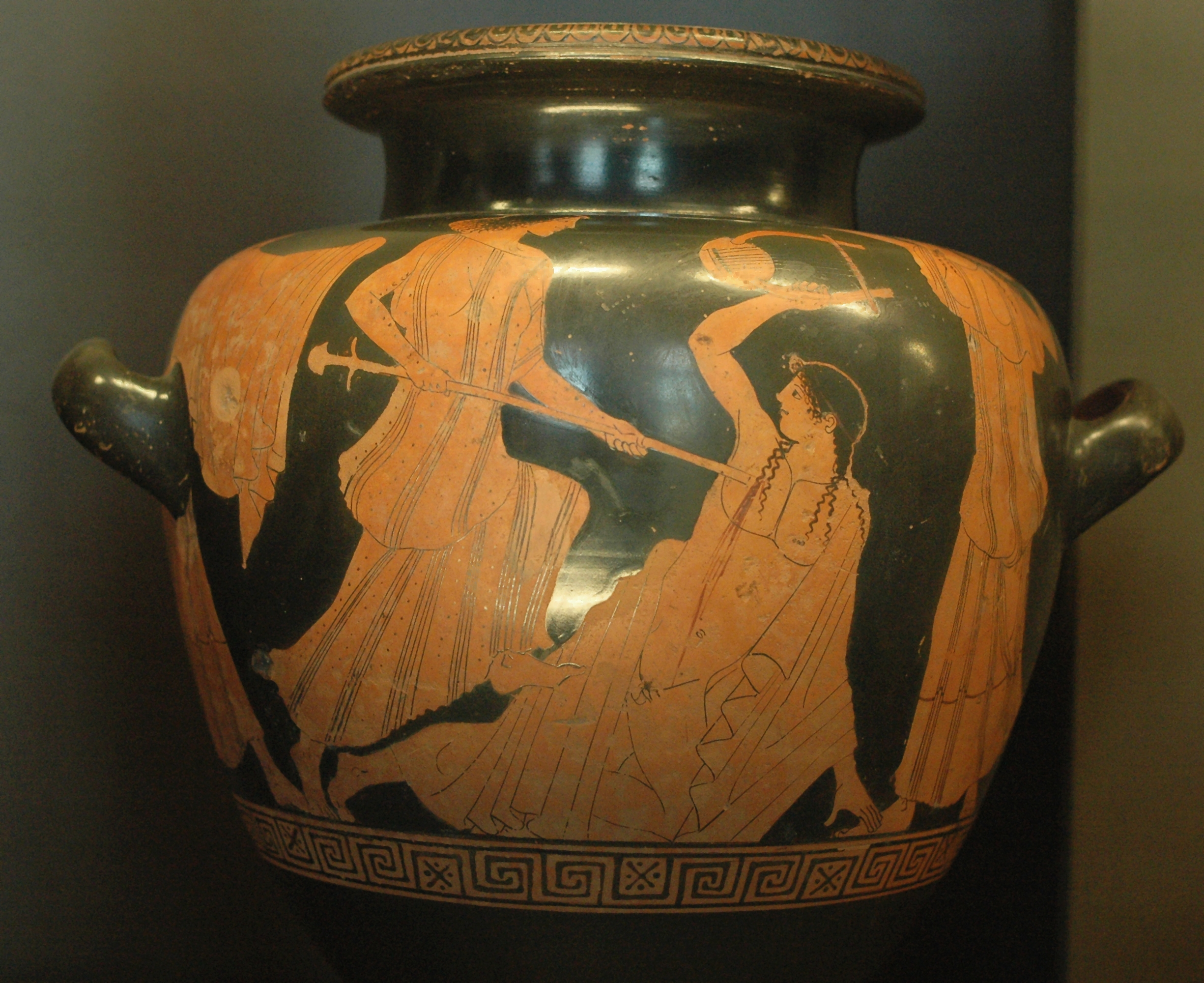
Hermonax: stamnos G 416, death of Orpheus, Paris, Louvre

Hermonax was a Greek vase painter working in the red-figure style. He painted between c. 470 and 440 BC in Athens. Ten vases signed with the phrase "Hermonax has painted it" survive, mainly stamnoi and lekythoi. He is generally a painter of large pots, though some cups survive.

== Background ==
Forming the beginning of the 'early classic' generation of vase-painters, Hermonax was a pupil of the Berlin Painter and a contemporary of the Providence Painter. Sir John Beazley attributed just over 150 vases to his hand. His work has been found all over the ancient Greek world from Marseille to Southern Russia.

Hermonax entered the Berlin Painter's workshop towards its end. As a pupil of the Berlin Painter Hermonax adopted the practice of painting large figural scenes on large vessels. His meander patterns, unlike those of his master, can be careless, as with the Providence Painter. A characteristic of his style is his depiction of the eyes with a concave bottom and a convex top.

The largest share of Hermonax' surviving work depicts Dionysiac themes.

== Appraisal ==
As Beazley states, "Sound and able as Hermonax's work generally is, he only once shows himself a remarkable artist, and that is not on any of his signed vases, but on the Munich stamnos...with the Birth of Erichthonios - Hauser has pointed out what was modern in that vase when it was painted; how the painter rejects the old-fashioned agreements of figure, face, and dress, and turns to a new kind of simplicity and truthfulness: new in his day, and fresh still, because the artist put his own thought, his own feeling into his shapes, and that keeps them alive and green."

As the 'brother' of the Providence Painter, he is seen as less technically proficient.

== Selected works ==
- Adria, Museo Civico

fragments of a bowl B 34 • fragments of a bowl B 296 • fragments of a bowl B 785

- Agrigento, Museo Archeologico Regionale

lekythos

- Altenburg, Staatliches Lindenau-Museum

amphora 289 • oinochoe 297

- Ancona, Museo Archeologico Nazionale

two fragments of different bowls

- Argos, Archaeological Museum

bell krater C 909

- Athens, Agora Museum

fragment of a loutrophoros P 15018 • hydria P 25101 • fragment of a stamnos P 25357 • fragment P 25357 A • fragment of a krater P 30017 • fragment of a bell krater P 30019 • fragment of a bowl CP 11948 • fragment of a lekythos P 30065 • fragment of a hydria P 30134 • fragments of a pelike P 8959

- Athens, Acropolis Museum

fragments of several loutrophoroi

- Athens, National Archaeological Museum

fragment 2.692 • lekythos 1632

- Baltimore, Walters Art Museum

amphora 48.55

- Barcelona, Museo Arqueologico

lekythos 581 • fragment of a bowl 4233.6

- Basel, Antikenmuseum Basel and Sammlung Ludwig

pelike BS 483 • oinochoe KA 430

- Berne, Historisches Museum

pelike 26454

- Bologna, Museo Civico Archeologico

oinochoe 344

- Boston, Museum of Fine Arts

stamnos 01.8031

- Boulogne, Musée Communal

amphora 125

- Bristol, City Museum

hydria H 4631

- Brussels, Royal Museums of Fine Arts of Belgium

pelike A 1579 • hydria A 3098

- Bryn Mawr, Bryn Mawr College

fragment of a bowl P 199 • fragment of a bowl P 209 • fragment of a bowl P 989

- Cambridge, Massachusetts, Harvard University, Arthur M. Sackler Museum

fragment of a bowl 1995.18.42

- Catania, Museo Civico

hydria 706

- Chicago, University of Chicago

pelike 171

- Christchurch, University of Canterbury

amphora

- Cologne, Cologne University

amphora 308

- Columbia, Missouri, Museum of Art & Archeology

amphora 83.187

- Corinth, Archaeological Museum

fragment of a krater C 66.40

- Dresden, Albertinum

fragment of a bowl

- Ferrara, Museo Nazionale di Spina

oinochoe 2461 • oinochoe B 31.5.1958 • lekanis T0 • oinochoe T 216 CVP • oinochoe T 607 • oinochoe T 897

- Florence, Museo Archeologico Etrusco

fragment of a stamnos 14B5 • fragment 14B53 • stamnos 3995 • fragment of a stamnos PD 421

- Gela, Museo Archeologico

lekythos N 115

- Glasgow, Museum & Art Gallery

pelike 1883.32A

- Gotha, Schlossmuseum

amphora 50

- Göttingen, Georg-August-Universität

fragment of a bowl H 74

- Hartford, Wadsworth Atheneum

lekythos 1930.184

- Heidelberg, Ruprecht-Karls-Universität

fragment of a stamnos 170 • pelike 171 • fragment of a lekythos 172 • fragment of a bowl 173

- Innsbruck, University

fragment of a bowl II.12.66 • fragment of a bowl II.12.67

- Istanbul, Archaeology Museum

fragment A 33.2322 • fragment of a bowl A 33.2350

- Karlsruhe, Badisches Landesmuseum

fragment of a bowl 69.35C • two fragments of a bowl 86.360 A-B • fragment of a bowl 69.35 C

- Kassel, Museum Schloß Wilhelmshöhe

amphora T 696

- Lancut, Castle Museum

neck amphora S 8176

- London, British Museum

amphora E 312 • pelike E 371 • pelike P 374 • stamnos E 445

- London, Victoria & Albert Museum

hydria 4816.1858

- Los Angeles, County Museum of Art

pelike A 5933.50.41

- Madrid, Museo Arqueológico Nacional

amphora 11098 • amphora L 172

- Mainz, Johannes Gutenberg Universität

fragment of a pelike (?) 144

- Manchester, City Art Gallery & Museum

pelike III.I.41

- Mannheim, Reiss-Museum

stamnos 59

- Marseille, Musée Borely

stamnos 1630 • pelike 3592 • pelike 7023

- Melfi, Museo Nazionale del Melfese

amphora (loan → Metaponto)

- Metaponto, Museo Civico

amphora 20113

- Montreal, Museum of Fine Arts

fragment of a bowl RS 470

- Moscow, Pushkin Museum

amphora 601 • amphora 1071

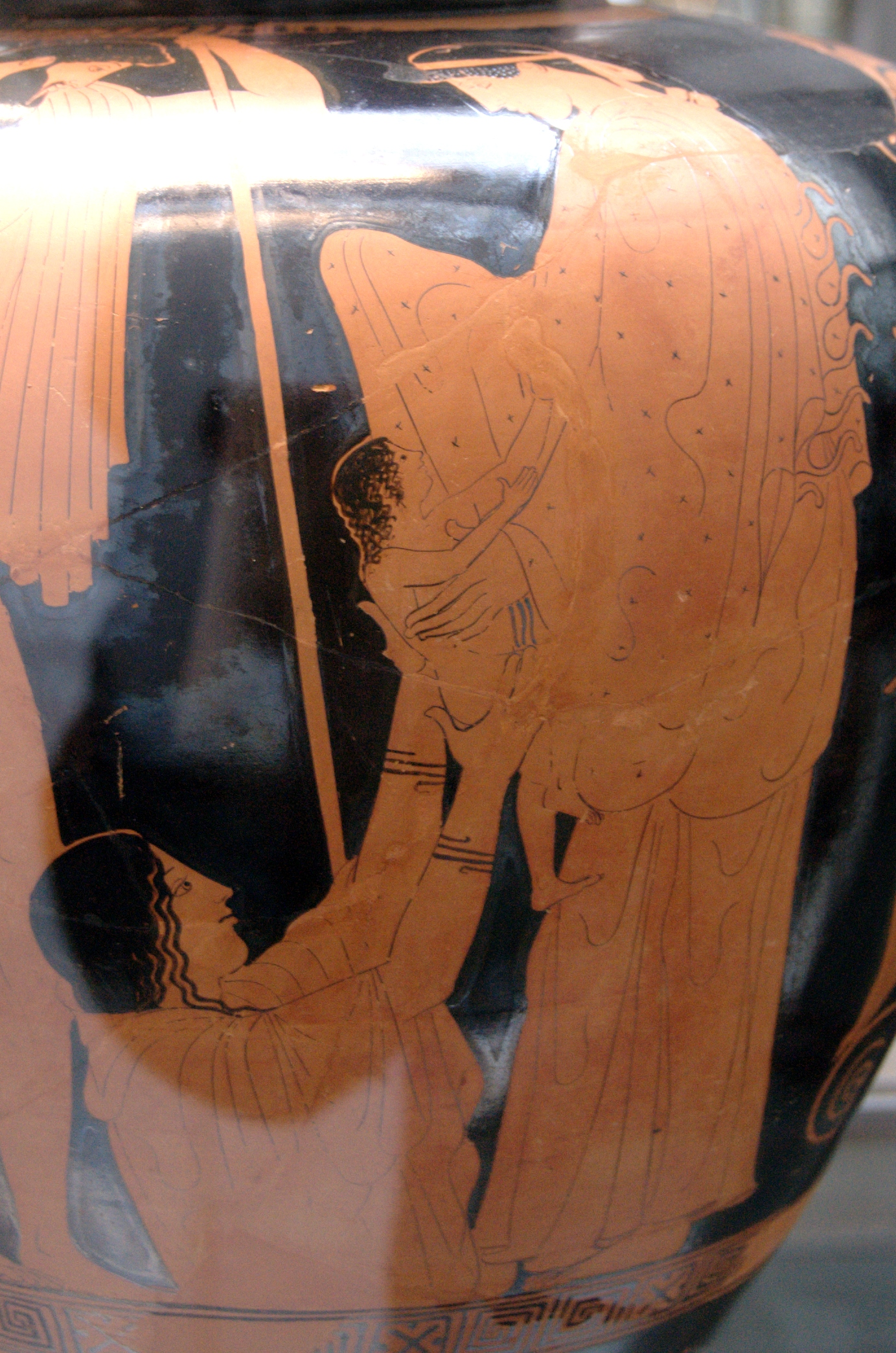
Birth of Erichthonios, Munich Antikensammlungen

- Munich, Glyptothek and Antikensammlung

stamnos 2413 • lekythos 2477 • lekythos 2478

- Münster, Archaeological Museum of Münster University

lekythos 668

- Naples, Museo Archeologico Nazionale

amphora 81481 • amphora H 3385 • pelike SP 2028

- Naples, Palazzo di San Nicandro (Museo Mustilli)

pelike

- New York, Metropolitan Museum of Art

lekythos 26.60.77 • lekythos 41.162.19 • bowl 1972.70.2 • fragment of a bowl 1972.257 • fragment of a bowl 1973.175.4A-B

- Norwich, Castle Museum

amphora 36.96

- Orvieto, Museo Civico (Collezione Faina)

bowl 43 • lekythos 66 A

- Oxford, Ashmolean Museum

amphora 1966.500

- Paestum, Museo Archeologico Nazionale

oinochoe 57799

- Palermo, Collezione Collisani

amphora R 33

- Palermo, Museo Archeologico Regionale

lekythos 1445 • lekythos V 672

- Paris, Bibliothèque Nationale, Cabinet des Médailles

lekythos 489

- Paris, Musée National du Louvre

pelike CP 10765 • fragment of a pelike CP 10766 • bowl CP 10955 • fragment of a pelike CP 11060 • fragment CP 11061 • fragment of a pelike CP 11064 • fragment of a stamnos CP 11065 • fragment of a stamnos CP 11067 • fragment CP 11068 • fragment of a bowl CP 11944 • fragment of a bowl CP 11945 • fragment of a bowl CP 11946 • fragment of a bowl CP 11947 • fragment of a bowl CP 11948 • fragment of a bowl CP 11949 • fragment of a bowl CP 11950 • fragment of a bowl CP 11951 • fragment of a bowl CP 11952 • fragment of a bowl CP 11953 • fragment of a bowl CP 11954 • bowl G 268 • stamnos G 336 • pelike G 374 • amphora G 376 • stamnos 413 • stamnos G 416 • pelike G 546 • oinochoe G 573

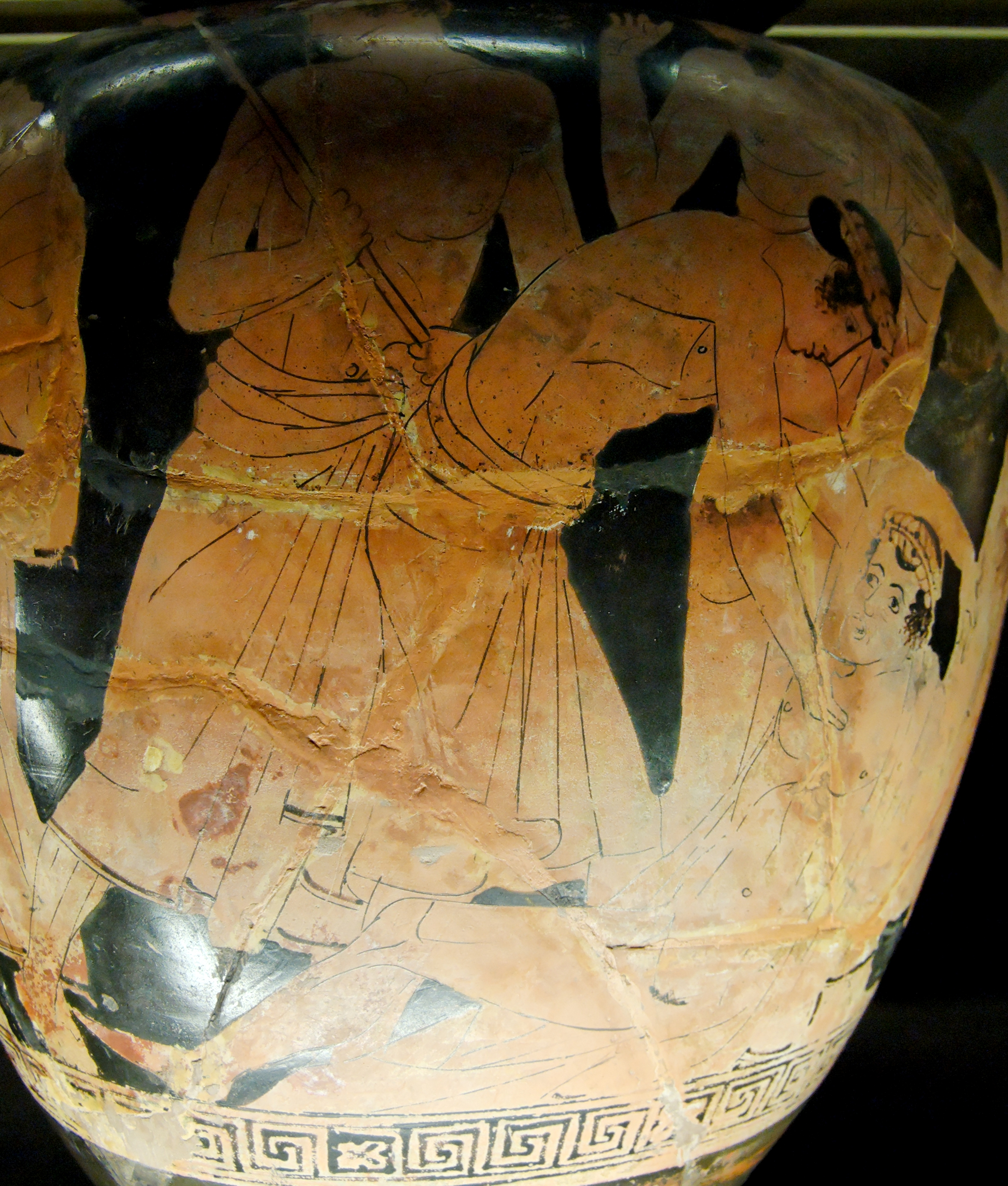
Stamnos Louvre G 413: Detail Philoktetes

- Rhodes, Archaeological Museum

hydria 12884

- Rome, Museo Nazionale di Villa Giulia

stamnos 5241 • pelike (Beazley Nr. 33) • pelike 50459

- Samothrace, Archaeological Museum

fragment of a bell krater

- St. Louis, St. Louis Art Museum

amphora WU 3271

- San Simeon, Hearst Corporation

amphora 12359

- St. Petersburg, Eremitage

amphora 696 • pelike 727 • stamnos 804 • stamnos 2070 • stamnos 4121 • fragment of a stamnos NB 6463 • amphora ST 1461 • amphora 1672 • amphora ST 1692 • stamnos ST 1694

- Sarajevo, Zemaljski muzej Bosne i Hercegovine

fragment of a hydria 31 • loutrophoros 389 • fragment of a loutrophoros 425 • fragment of a loutrophoros 426

- Stockholm, Medelhavsmuseum

bowl G2334

- Syracuse, Museo Archeologico Regionale Paolo Orsi

lekythos 24552

- Tampa, Tampa Museum of Art

kylix 86.89

- Trieste, Museo Storia ed Arte

stamnos S 424

- Tübingen, University of Tübingen

fragment of a bowl E 43 • fragment of a loutrophoros E 90 • fragment of a loutrophoros E 99 • fragment of a pelike S101583

- Vatican City, Museo Gregoriano Etrusco Vaticano

stamnos 16526

- Vienna, Kunsthistorisches Museum

pelike 336 • pelike 1095 • pelike IV 3728

- Vienna, Vienna University

fragment of a bowl 503.50 • fragment

- Wiesbaden, Landesamt

amphora

- Würzburg, Martin von Wagner Museum

amphora L 504

- Zürich, Zurich University

fragment of a stamnos 3550 • bowl L 95

== Bibliography ==
- Hanns E. Langenfass: Hermonax. Untersuchungen zur Chronologie. München, Univ., Diss. 1972.
- John H. Oakley: Athamas, Ino, Hermes, and the Infant Dionysos. A Hydria by Hermonax. Antike Kunst 25 (1982), p. 44-47.
- Cornelia Isler-Kerényi: Hermonax in Zürich, 1. Ein Puzzle mit Hermonaxscherben. Antike Kunst 26 (1983), p. 127-135.
- Cornelia Isler-Kerényi: Hermonax in Zürich, 2. Die Halsamphora Haniel. Antike Kunst 27 (1984), p. 54-57.
- Cornelia Isler-Kerényi: Hermonax in Zürich, 3. Der Schalenmaler. Antike Kunst 27 (1984), p. 154-165.
- Cornelia Isler-Kerényi: Hieron und Hermonax. In: Ancient Greek and related pottery. Proceedings of the international vase symposium, Amsterdam 12–15 April 1984 (Amsterdam 1984), p. 164.
- Cornelia Isler-Kerényi: Hermonax e i suoi temi dionisiaci. In: Images et sociétés en Grèce ancienne. L'iconographie comme méthode d'analyse. Actes du Colloque international, Lausanne 8-11 février 1984 (Lausanne 1987), p. 169-175.
