= Four seasons altar of Würzburg =

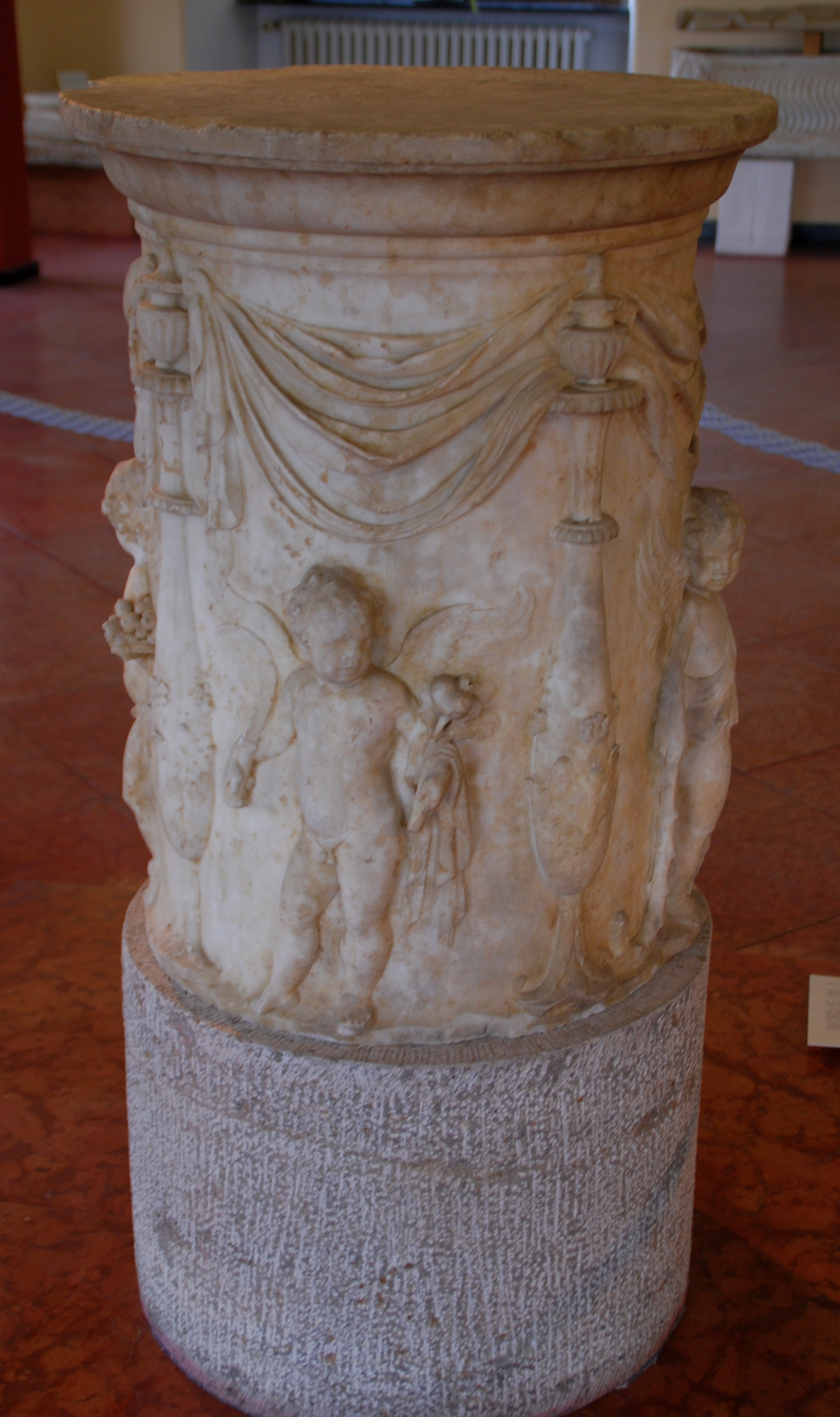
Summer cherub

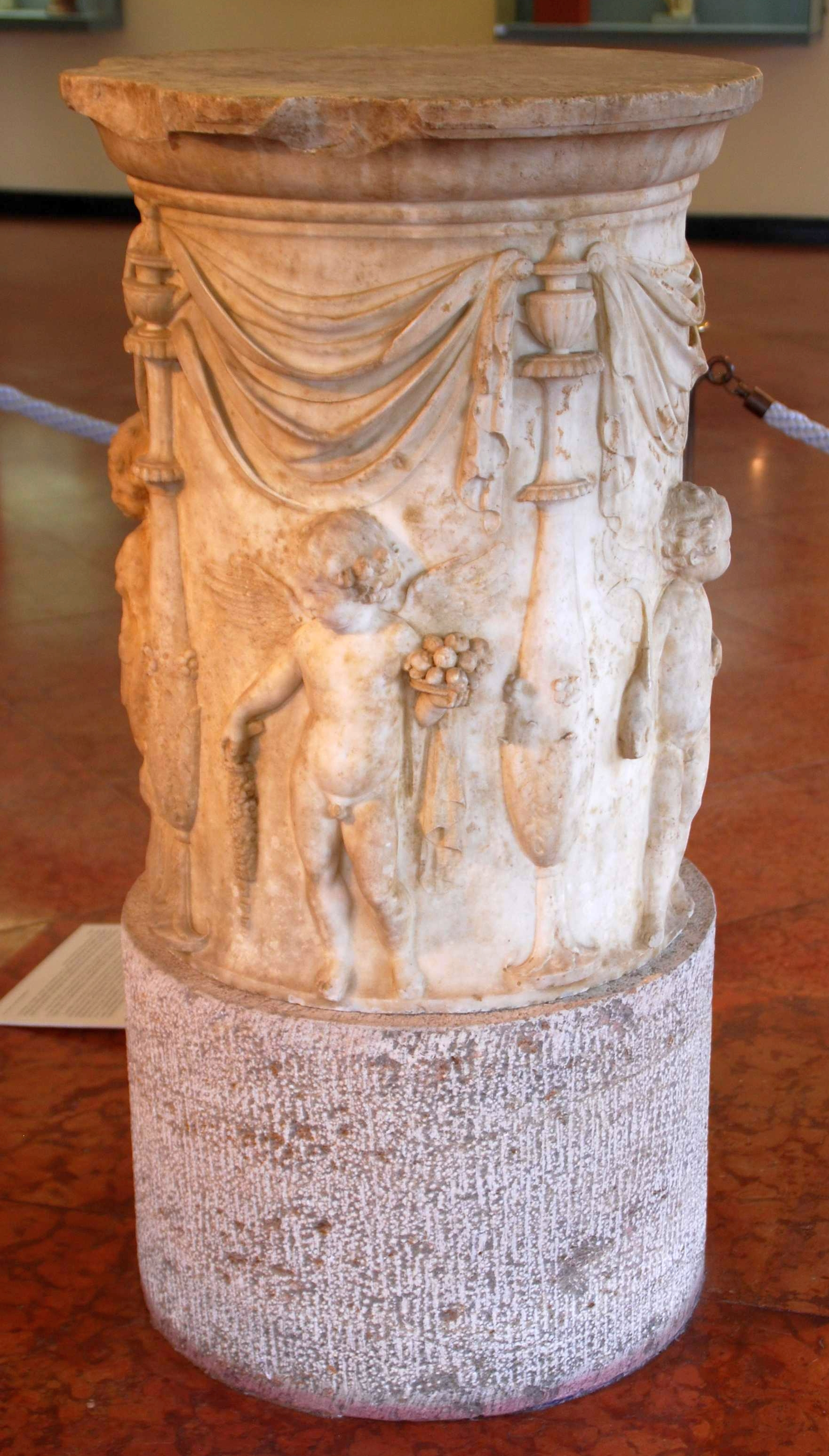
Autumn cherub

A Roman decorated altar dating from early in the reign of Claudius (around AD 40) is known as the Four seasons altar of Würzburg (de: Würzburger Vierjahreszeitenaltar). It is kept in the Martin von Wagner Museum in Würzburg under the inventory number H 5056.

== Discovery ==
The altar was found in 1886 on the Pincian Hill in Rome, once the site of the Horti Sallustiani and later an imperial property. The altar was immediately published, but it was soon forgotten. Decades later it turned up in an American private collection. In 1966 it was brought back to Rome, thanks to the artefact trade of Gorgio Fallani. There it was acquired for the antiquities division of Martin von Wagner Museum in Würzburg by Erika Simon who recognised the lost altar. The Italian state could raise no claim to the work after eighty years. The work was almost taken by the Antikensammlung Berlin, after Erika Simon made Friedrich Matz Junior and the director of the West Berlin collection Adolf Greifenhagen aware of the altar. However, despite the larger offer, Fallani sold the altar to Würzburg in accordance with his earlier promise.

== Description ==
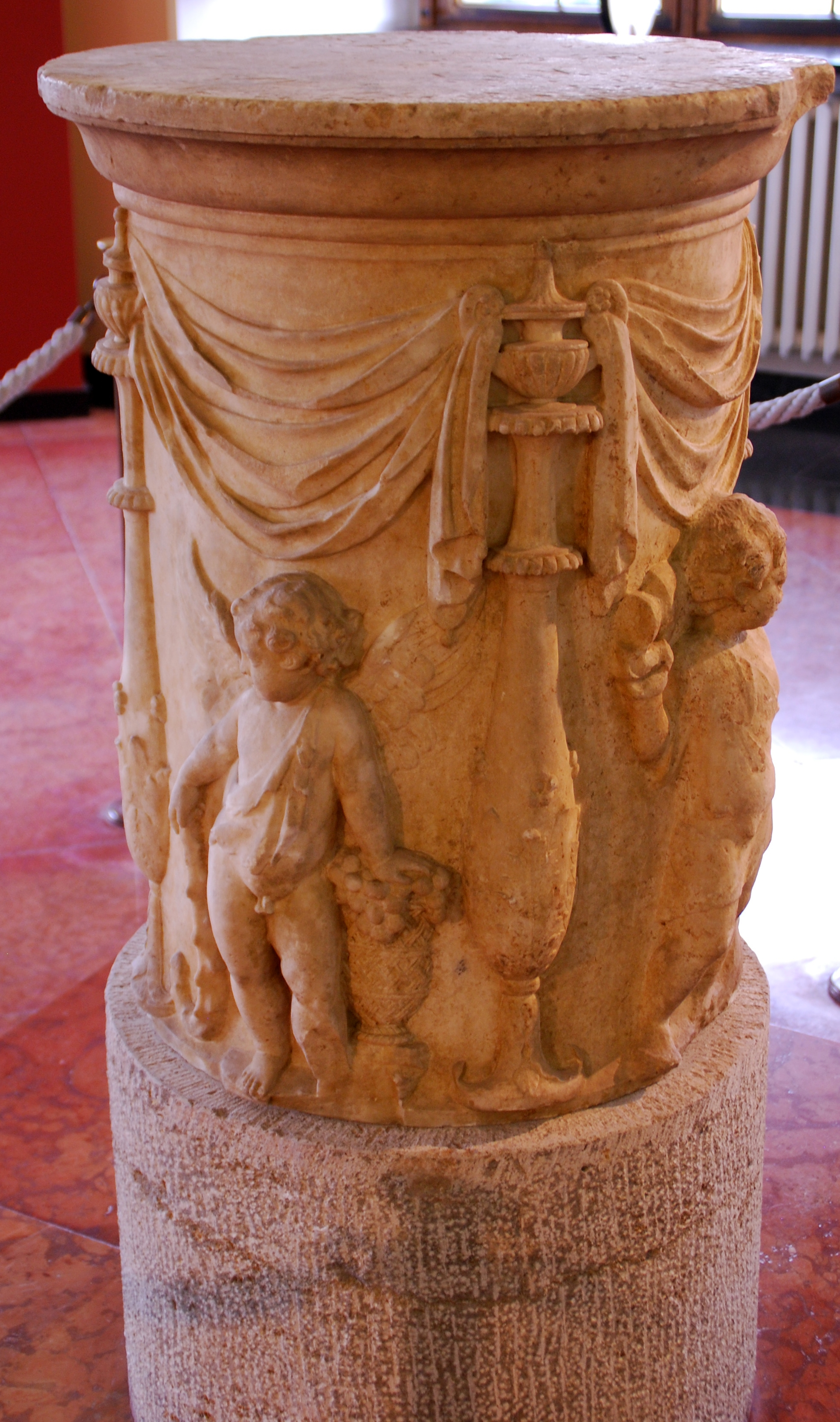
Winter cherub at left

The four seasons altar made of fine-grained white marble had a height of 73 centimetres and a diameter of 56.4 centimetres. Apart from a few nicks, it remains fully intact. The putto representing the winter received some damage during the carving of the dead animal, which was not repaired.

The round altar shows four putti evenly spaced around it, which seem from their attributes to represent the four seasons. Winter is dressed as a farmworker and points to winter activities with a slaughtered animal and a wine amphora. The other three personifications allude to deities, who are symbolically associated with the four seasons by authors of the literary tradition, such as Ovid and Lucretius. A girdle of flowers recalls that of the spring goddesses Venus and Flora; ears of corn and poppies refer to the goddess of fertility and summer, Ceres. The putto of autumn recalls a satyr and holds a basket of grapes, symbolising the wine and autumn god Bacchus. The winter and spring putti face each other, as do the putti of autumn and summer.

== Purpose ==
The altar was probably intended less for cultic purposes than as an evocative garden ornament. Also, in the early imperial period, Imperial princes were depicted as cherubs, so there is probably a political significance in addition to the decorative function, which aimed for a prosperous growth of the Julio-Claudian dynasty.
