= Irma Wehgartner =

German art historian and archaeologist

Irma Wehgartner is a German Classical archaeologist.

Irma Wehgartner studied classical archaeology, prehistory, protohistory and ancient history at Würzburg and Munich. She graduated from Würzburg University in 1980 with the work, Attisch weissgrundige Keramik. Maltechniken, Werkstätten, Formen, Verwendung (Attic White-ground Ceramics. Painting technique, Workshops, Forms, Use) which remains the fundamental work on this theme, to this day. After this she worked on Volume 51, Würzburg 3 of Corpus Vasorum Antiquorum Deutschland in which the Etruscan pottery of Martin von Wagner Museum was published. From the mid-1980s until 1993, Wehgartner was employed by the Antikensammlung Berlin. At this time she worked on Volume 62, Berlin 8, a further volume of the Corpus Vasorum Antiquorum. In addition, she organised the major exhibition, Die Etrusker und Europa (The Etruscans and Europe) as well as Euphronius, der Maler (Euphronius the Painter) and the accompanying conference. From 1993 until her retirement in 2012, she was conservator of the Martin von Wagner Museum in Würzburg. Wehgartner mainly researched ancient pottery and Greek vase painting, but also glasswork and the plastic arts of antiquity.

== Writings ==
Attisch weissgrundige Keramik. Maltechniken, Werkstätten, Formen, Verwendung

(Attic White-ground Ceramics. Painting technique, Workshops, Forms, Use), van Zabern, Mainz 1983 ISBN 3-8053-0565-6 (Keramikforschungen, Vol. 5)

Ein Grabbild des Achilleusmalers

(A Tomb Scene of the Achilles Painter), de Gruyter, Berlin 1985 ISBN 3-11-010690-6 (Winckelmannsprogramm der Archäologischen Gesellschaft zu Berlin, Vol. 129)

Edited. Euphronios und seine Zeit. Kolloquium in Berlin 19./20. April 1991 anlässlich der Ausstellung Euphronios, der Maler

(Euphronios and his Times. Colloquium in Berlin 19/20 April 1991 on the Occasion of the Exhibition Euphronios, the Painter), Staatliche Museen zu Berlin, Preußischer Kulturbesitz, Berlin 1992 ISBN 3-88609-129-5

Edited. Die Etrusker und Europa. Paris 1992, Berlin 1993. Altes Museum, Berlin, 28.2. - 31.5.1993

(The Etruscans and Europe. Paris 1992, Berlin 1993. Altes Museum, Berlin, 28.2. - 31.5.1993), Fabbri, Mailand 1993 / Bertelsmann-Lexikon-Verlag, Gütersloh - Munich 1993 ISBN 3-570-10504-0

Edited with Ulrich Sinn. Begegnungen mit der Antike. Zeugnisse aus vier Jahrtausenden mittelmeerischer Kultur im Martin-von-Wagner-Museum der Universität Würzburg

(Encounters with Antiquity. Evidence of Four Millennia of Mediterranean Culture at the Martin von Wagner Museum of Würzburg University), Ergon, Würzburg 2001 ISBN 3-935556-72-1

Edited with Johanna Wich. Schrift, Sprache, Bild und Klang. Entwicklungsstufen der Schrift von der Antike bis in die Neuzeit. Sonderausstellung der Fakultät für Altertums- und Kulturwissenschaften der Universität Würzburg in Verbindung mit dem Lehrstuhl für Alte Geschichte im Jubiläumsjahr der Universität Würzburg, 23. April - 31. August 2002

(Script, Speech, Image and Sound. Development of Writing from Antiquity into Modern Times. Special Exhibition of Würzburg University in connection with the Department of Ancient History for the Würzburg University Jubilee, 23 April - 31 August 2002), Ergon, Würzburg 2002 ISBN 3-89913-242-4 (Nachrichten aus dem Martin-von-Wagner-Museum der Universität Würzburg. Reihe A, Antikensammlung, Vol. 4)

With Vilma Gedzevičiūtė and Michaela Knief. 2000 Jahre antikes Glas. Schmuck und Alltagsgerät. Die Sammlung antiker Gläser im Martin-von-Wagner-Museum der Universität Würzburg. Katalog zur Sonderausstellung der Antikensammlung des Martin-von-Wagner-Museums vom 6. Juli - 7. November 2010

(2000 Years of Ancient Glass. Decorative and Daily Wear. The Collection of Ancient Glass in the Martin von Wagner Museum of Würzburg University. Catalogue of the Special Exhibition of the Antiquities Collection of Martin von Wagner Museum from 6 July - 7 November 2010), Ergon, Würzburg 2010 ISBN 978-3-89913-789-7 (Nachrichten aus dem Martin-von-Wagner-Museum der Universität Würzburg. Reihe A, Antikensammlung, Vol 11)
