= Martin von Wagner Museum =

Art museum in Würzburg, Germany

Coordinates: 49.79272°N 09.93926°E

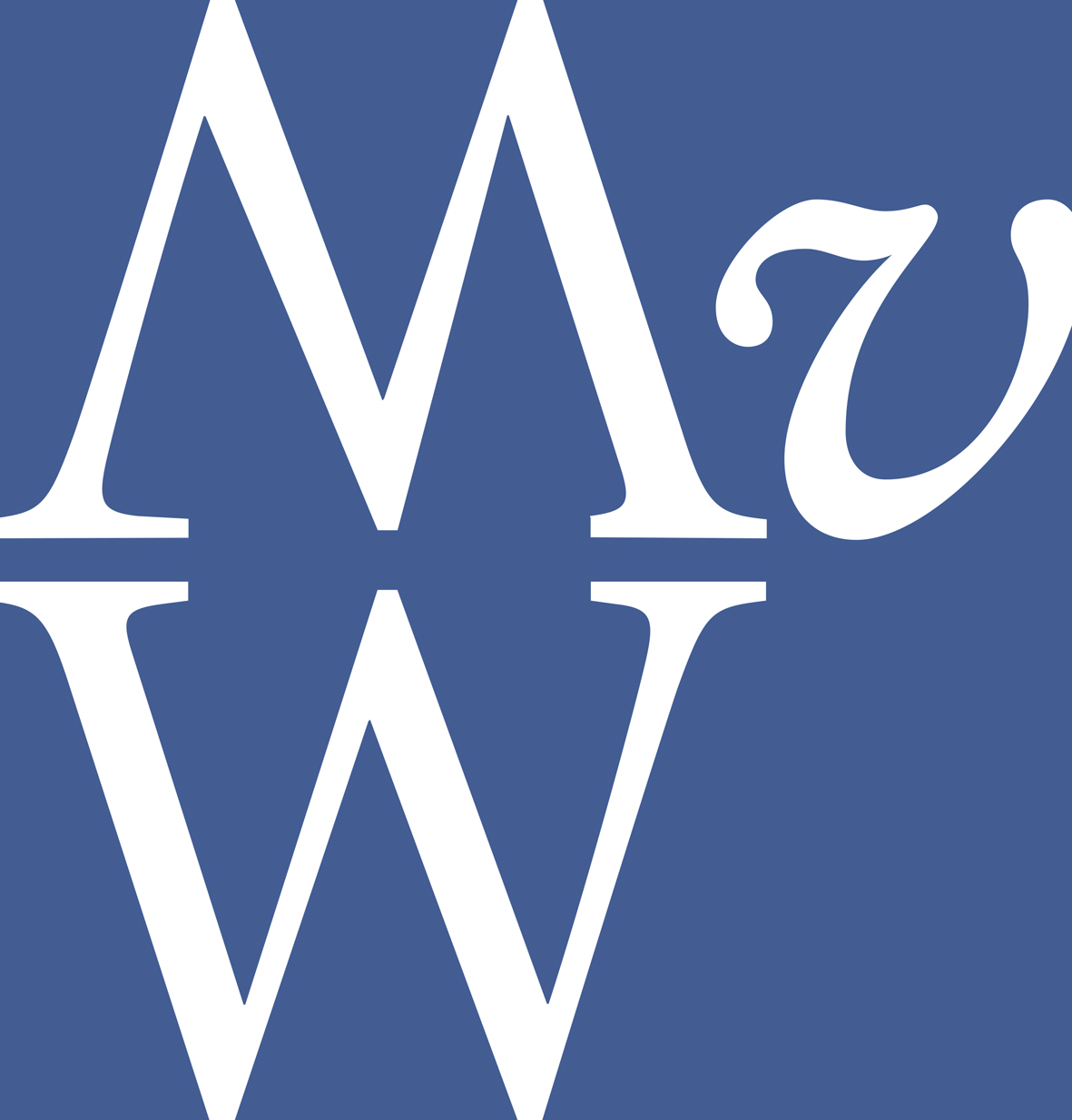
Sign of the Museum

Martin von Wagner Museum, Würzburg

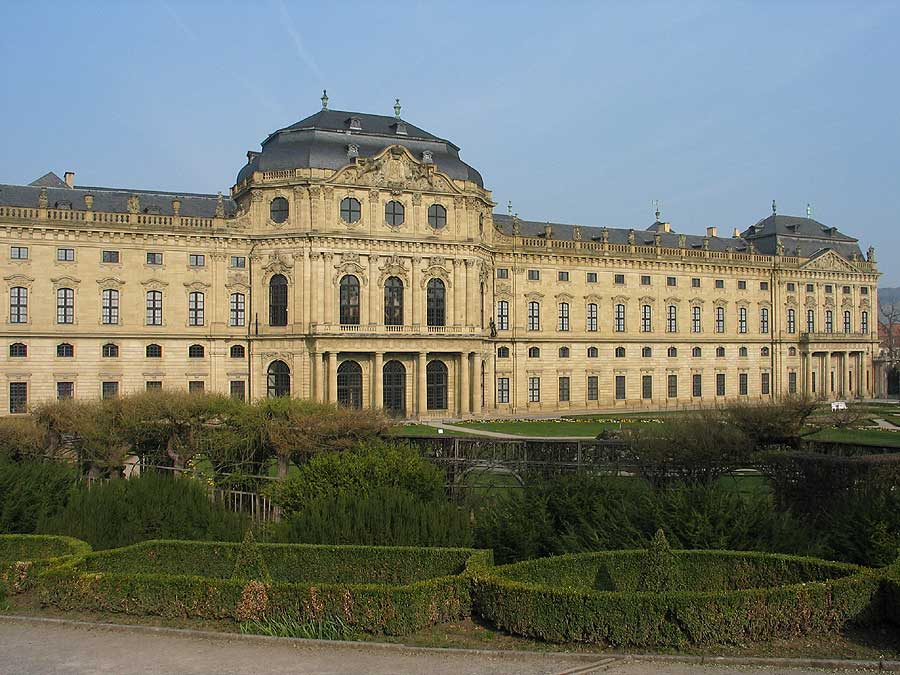
The Würzburg Residence, in which the Museum is located.

The Martin von Wagner Museum contains the art collection of the University of Würzburg and has been located in the south wing of the Würzburg Residence since 1963. It is among the largest university museums in Europe.

== History ==
Franz Joseph Fröhlich, a musicologist and lecturer of the arts at the University of Würzburg assembled the collection as it was formerly know Ästhetisches Attribut in 1832 with a purchase budget by the Bavarian Ministry of the Interior. This was the nucleus of the university art museum, which was then located on the upper floor of the old university. Fröhlich's art collection, mainly comprised Dutch masters of the 17th and 18th centuries.

In 1857 the German-Roman painter and sculptor Johann Martin von Wagner (1777-1858) donated his large collection of ancient and modern works which substantially extended the art collection. Wagner was also active as an archaeologist built up this large collection while working as artistic agent for the Bavarian King Ludwig I of Bavaria. Important works such as the Head of a Centaur from the Parthenon or the Madonna del Bambino Vispo were now included in the “Aesthetic Attribute” inventory, along with thousands of valuable hand drawings and copperplate engravings, mainly by Italian masters of the Renaissance and Baroque periods. In gratitude the museum adopted the name of Martin von Wagner.

In 1963 the museum was relocated to the south wing of the Würzburg Residence where it occupies most of the residence.

== Collections ==
The museum consists of two departments, one historic and one modern. The older department includes the collection of antiquities, the newer department is divided into the picture gallery and the graphic collection. The older and the newer departments of the Martin von Wagner Museum are headed by two habilitated scientists who are supported by an advisory board consisting of several museum-related specialists from the University of Würzburg and a total of four external members, who are usually heads of larger museum collections.

=== Collection of Antiquities ===
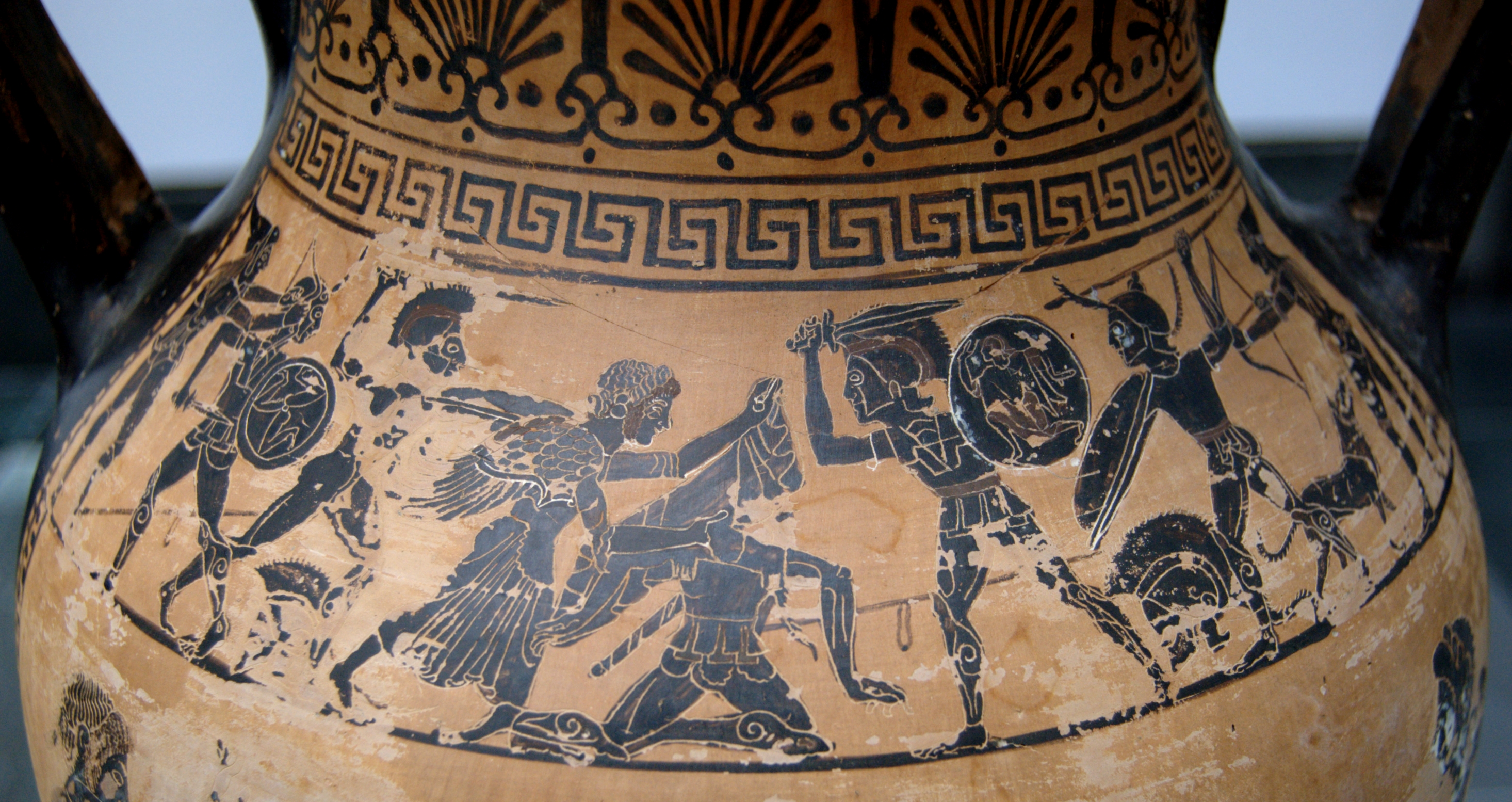
Etruscan black figure amphora in the Museum's collection (L 793)

The collection of antiquities includes artworks and antiquities of the Mediterranean from the third century BC until Late Antiquity. Works from Ancient Greece are the focus, but the collection also includes material from Imperial Rome, the Etruscans, Ancient Egypt and Near Eastern cultures (e.g. the Aegean civilizations, Mesopotamia, and Cyprus). The collection of Greek vases is particularly significant - it is among the three largest collections of Greek vases in Germany, containing around five thousand objects and documents on Greek pottery from the Mycenaean period through to the Hellenistic period. Important items include the Mamarce Oinochoe, the Four seasons altar of Würzburg and the Brygos Cup of Würzburg.

=== Picture Gallery ===
The art gallery contains German, Dutch and Italian paintings from the fifteenth century to the twentieth century, including pictures by Hans Leonhard Schäufelein, Bartholomäus Spranger, Pieter Claesz, Luca Giordano, Giovanni Battista Tiepolo, Friedrich Overbeck, Carl Rottmann, Franz von Lenbach, Max Liebermann, August von Brandis and Hans Purrmann. This section also contains the collection of sculpture. Notable among these are works of Tilman Riemenschneider and his school.

=== Graphic Collection ===
The Graphic Collection has around 16,000 hand drawings and 14,000 sheets of prints. These include, among others, copper engravings and woodcuts of Albrecht Dürer, sketches by Federico Barocci and drawings by Giovanni Battista Tiepolo and his son Giovanni Domenico Tiepolo.

== Bibliography ==
- Volker Hoffmann und Konrad Koppe: Martin von Wagner Museum der Universität Würzburg. Gemäldekatalog, Würzburg 1986.
