= Ulrich Sinn =

German classical archaeologist

- Born: 4 October 1945 (age 81); Bevensen, Germany
- Known for: Research on Greek sanctuaries, especially Olympia Greek architectural sculpture, vase painting, and history of ancient sports
- Title: Professor of Classical Archaeology Chair, University of Würzburg (1994–2011)
- Spouse: Friederike Sinn

Academic background
- Education: University of Freiburg
- Thesis: 'Die ‚Homerischen’ Becher. Hellenistische Reliefkeramik aus Makedonien' (1975)
- Doctoral advisor: Walter-Herwig Schuchhardt

Ulrich Sinn (born 4 October 1945 in Bevensen) is a German classical archaeologist.

Ulrich Sinn graduated from the humanist gymnasium Johanneum in Lüneburg. After completing military service, he first studied education in Karlsruhe from 1967 to 1968, then classical archaeology, ancient history and particularly art history at the University of Freiburg. During this time he took part in excavations in Southern Italy and Greece and participated in field trips to Athens and Olympia.

Sinn received his doctorate in 1975 with a thesis about Die ‚Homerischen’ Becher. Hellenistische Reliefkeramik aus Makedonien (The "Homeric" Cup. Hellenistic Ceramic Reliefs of Macedonia), supervised by Walter-Herwig Schuchhardt. In 1974/5 he held a one-year volontariat at the Staatlichen Kunstsammlungen in Kassel. In 1975/6 he received a travel grant from the German Archaeological Institute. From 1976 to 1979 Sinn was Referent at the German Archaeological Institute at Athens, where he participated in the excavations of the Heraion of Samos among other things. Subsequently, Sinn was scholarly assistant at the archaeological institute of the University of Bonn from 1979 to 1984. In 1982 he was accepted to corresponding membership of the German Archaeological Institute. Since 1985, Sinn has led the international research project, "Olympia in der römischen Kaiserzeit und der Spätantike" (Olympia in the Roman Imperial Period and late antiquity) through the Olympia excavations of the German Archaeological Institute. As a result, he received teaching positions at various international institutions in Athens. In 1989, Sinn received his habilitation from the University of Bonn for his work, Die griechischen Heiligtümer als Stätten der Hikesie (Greek Sanctuaries as Places of Hikesia (Prayer)). From 1992 until 1994, Sinn was professor of classical archaeology at the University of Augsburg, from 1994 to 2011 he held the chair of classical archaeology at the University of Würzburg. This involved control of the university's antiquities collection in the Martin von Wagner Museum. From 2003 to 2009, Sinn was vice-president of the University of Würzburg.

Sinn's chief research interests are the functions, organisation and topography of Greek sanctuaries, especially Olympia, Greek architectural sculpture, minor arts, vase painting, the history of ancient sports and ancient architecture.

Sinn is married to classical archaeologist Friederike Sinn.

== Writings (selection) ==
Die Homerischen Becher. Hellenistische Reliefkeramik aus Makedonien

(The Homeric Cup. Hellenistic Ceramic Reliefs of Macedonia). Berlin 1979 (Mitteilungen des Deutschen Archäologischen Instituts, Athenische Abteilung, Beiheft 7)

"Das Heiligtum der Artemis Limnatis bei Kombothekra."

("The Sanctuary of Artemis Limnatis at Kombothekra) Mitteilungen des Deutschen Archäologischen Instituts, Athenische Abteilung 96, 1981, pp. 25-71.

Olympia. Kult, Sport und Fest in der Antike.

(Olympia. Cult, Sport, and Festival in Antiquity) C. H. Beck, München 1996, Revised edition 2002 (Beck'sche Reihe Wissen 39)
Translated into English, edited and updated as: Olympia. Cult, Sport, and Ancient Festival, Markus Wiener Publishers, Princeton, NJ. 2000) (also as audiobook, documentary film and further translations into Spanish and Czech)

Olympia.

(Olympia) in Der Neue Pauly, Vol. 8, 2000, pp. 1169–1183.

Einführung in das Studium der Klassischen Archäologie

(Introduction to the Study of Classical Archaeology) C. H. Beck, München 2000 (C.H. Beck Studium)

Das antike Olympia. Götter, Spiel und Kunst.

(Ancient Olympia. Gods, Games, and Art) 3rd Edition, C. H. Beck, München 2004

Athen. Archäologie und Geschichte

(Athens. Archaeology and History) C. H. Beck, München 2004 (Beck'sche Reihe Wissen)

The Sanctuary of Zeus Lykaios. "EI" Magazine of European Art Center (EUARCE) of Greece, 3st issue 1993' p. 55
