= Lists of fellows of the British Academy =

The Fellowship of the British Academy consists of world-leading scholars and researchers in the humanities and social sciences. A number of fellows are elected each year in July at the academy's annual general meeting.

== Fellows elected by decade ==
- 2020s
- 2010s
- 2000s
- 1990s
- 1980s
- 1970s
- 1960s
- 1950s
- 1940s
- 1930s
- 1920s
- 1910s
- 1900s

== Types of fellows ==
- List of female fellows of the British Academy
- List of corresponding fellows of the British Academy
- List of honorary fellows of the British Academy

== See also ==
- Awards of the British Academy
