= List of fellows of the British Academy elected in the 1900s =

The Fellowship of the British Academy consists of world-leading scholars and researchers in the humanities and social sciences. Fellows are elected each year in July at the Academy's annual general meeting.

== First fellows ==
The following fellows were appointed in the Charter of the Incorporation of the British Academy on 8 August 1902:

- The Right Honourable The Earl of Rosebery, KG, KT
- The Right Honourable The Viscount Dillon, President of the Society of Antiquaries
- The Right Honourable The Lord Reay, GCSI, GCIE, President of the Royal Asiatic Society
- The Right Honourable Arthur James Balfour, MP
- The Right Honourable John Morley, MP
- The Right Honourable James Bryce, MP
- The Right Honourable William Edward Hartpole Lecky, MP
- Sir William Reynell Anson, Baronet, MP, Warden of All Souls College, Oxford
- Sir Frederick Pollock, Baronet, Corpus Professor of Jurisprudence in the University of Oxford
- Sir Edward Maunde Thompson, KCB., Director and Principal Librarian, British Museum
- Sir Henry Churchill Maxwell-Lyte, KCB, Deputy-Keeper of the Public Records
- Sir Courtenay Peregrine Ilbert, KCSI, CIE
- Sir Richard Claverhouse Jebb, MP, Regius Professor of Greek in the University of Cambridge
- David Binning Monro, Provost of Oriel College and Vice-Chancellor of the University of Oxford
- Adolphus William Ward, Master of Peterhouse and Vice-Chancellor of the University of Cambridge
- Edward Caird, Master of Balliol College, Oxford
- Henry Francis Pelham, President of Trinity College and Camden Professor of Ancient History in the University of Oxford
- John Rhys, Principal of Jesus College and Professor of Celtic in the University of Oxford
- The Reverend George Salmon, DD, Provost of Trinity College, Dublin
- John Bagnell Bury, Regius Professor of Greek in the University of Dublin
- Samuel Henry Butcher, Professor of Greek in the University of Edinburgh
- Ingram Bywater, Regius Professor of Greek in the University of Oxford
- Edward Byles Cowell, Professor of Sanskrit in the University of Cambridge
- The Reverend William Cunningham, DD
- Thomas William Rhys Davids, Professor of Pali in University College, London
- Albert Venn Dicey, KC, Vinerian Professor of English Law in the University of Oxford
- The Reverend Canon Samuel Rolles Driver, DD, Regius Professor of Hebrew in the University of Oxford
- Robinson Ellis, Corpus Professor of Latin in the University of Oxford
- Arthur John Evans, Keeper of the Ashmolean Museum, Oxford
- The Reverend Andrew Martin Fairbairn, DD, Principal of Mansfield College, Oxford
- The Reverend Robert Flint, DD, Professor of Divinity in the University of Edinburgh
- James George Frazer
- Israel Gollancz, University Lecturer in English in the University of Cambridge
- Thomas Hodgkin
- Shadworth Hollway Hodgson
- Thomas Erskine Holland, KC, Professor of International Law and Diplomacy in the University of Oxford
- Frederick William Maitland, Downing Professor of English Law in the University of Cambridge
- Alfred Marshall, Professor of Political Economy in the University of Cambridge
- The Reverend John Eyton Bickersteth Mayor, Professor of Latin in the University of Cambridge
- James Augustus Henry Murray
- William Mitchell Ramsay, Professor of Humanity in the University of Aberdeen
- The Reverend Canon William Sanday, DD, Lady Margaret Professor of Divinity in the University of Oxford
- The Reverend Walter William Skeat, Elrington and Bosworth Professor of Anglo-Saxon in the University of Cambridge
- Leslie Stephen
- Whitley Stokes CSI, CIE
- Rev Henry Barclay Swete, DD, Regius Professor of Divinity in the University of Cambridge
- Rev. Henry Fanshawe Tozer
- Robert Yelverton Tyrrell, Professor of Ancient History in the University of Dublin
- James Ward, Professor of Mental Philosophy in the University of Cambridge

== 1903 ==
The following were elected fellows in March 1903:

- Professor B. Bosanquet
- Professor E. G. Browne
- Arthur Cohen, KC
- F. C. Conybeare
- F. Y. Edgeworth
- C. H. Firth
- A. Campbell Fraser
- Sir Edward Fry
- Dr F. J. Furnivall
- Professor P. Gardner
- Dr Henry Jackson
- Dr M. R. James
- Dr F. G. Kenyon
- Professor W. P. Ker
- The Lord Lindley
- Sir A. Lyall, KCB, GCIE
- Professor W. R. Morfill
- Dr A. S. Murray
- Professor J. S. Nicholson
- Dr G. W. Prothero
- Very Rev. J. Armitage Robinson, DD
- Professor G. F. Stout

== 1904 ==
The following were elected fellows in June 1904:

- Rev. Professor T. K. Cheyne, DD
- F. J. Haverfield
- Professor Henry Jones
- Professor A. S. Napier
- Professor A. Seth Pringle Pattison
- Dr John Peile
- Professor W. M. Flinders Petrie
- Dr R. L. Poole
- Professor W. Ridgeway
- Sir G. O. Trevelyan, Baronet
- Sir Spencer Walpole, KCB
- Professor Joseph Wright

== 1905 ==
- Professor F. C. Burkitt
- Professor H. S. Foxwell
- Professor W. M. Lindsay
- Sir Charles W. C. Oman, KBE, MP
- Professor W. R. Sorley
- Edward Armstrong
- Lord Davey
- Lord Goschen
- Professor B. P. Grenfell
- Dr D. G. Hogarth, CMG
- Sir Paul Vinogradoff
- John Wordsworth

== 1906 ==
- Sir G. F. Warner
- Ven. Archdeacon Charles
- Dr W. J. Courthope, CB
- Professor J. FitzMaurice-Kelly
- Andrew Lang
- Professor A. A. MacDonell
- Dr J. Ellis McTaggart
- Rev. Canon Moore

== 1907 ==
- H. A. L. Fisher
- Dr Henry Bradley
- Professor J. P. Postgate
- Professor J. Cook Wilson

== 1908 ==
- Marquess Curzon of Keddleston, KG

== 1909 ==
- Professor Hume Brown
- Lord Justice Kennedy
- Professor C. S. Kenny
- Very Rev. Hastings Rashdall
- Sir John E. Sandys
- Professor Cuthbert H. Turner

== See also ==
- List of fellows of the British Academy
