= David Slater (disambiguation) =

David Slater (born 1962) is an American singer.

David Slater is also the name of:

- David A. Slater (1866–1938), English classicist, academic and schoolmaster
- David Michael Slater (born 1970), American author
- David W. Slater (1921–2010), Canadian economist, civil servant and former President of York University
- David Slater, author of Killing for Culture
- David J. Slater, British nature photographer from Mathern, South Wales, known for the so-called monkey selfies
- David Slater, see 1976 IAAF World Cross Country Championships
- Dave Slater, see List of Canada national rugby union players
