= List of fellows of the British Academy elected in the 1920s =

The British Academy consists of world-leading scholars and researchers in the humanities and social sciences. Each year, it elects fellows to its membership. The following were elected in the 1920s.

== 1920 ==
- Professor W. W. Buckland
- Professor A. F. Pollard

== 1921 ==
- Professor C. F. Bastable
- Very Rev. W. R. Inge, KCVO
- Sir Aurel Stein, KCIE
- Professor James Tait

== 1922 ==
- T. W. Allen
- Professor A. L. Bowley
- O. M. Dalton
- Sir W. S. Holdsworth, KC
- Professor H. H. Joachim
- Dr A. G. Little
- Professor R. A. Nicholson
- Professor A. W. Pollard, CB

== 1923 ==
- Dr P. S. Allen
- Professor H. J. C. Grierson
- Professor J. L. Myres, OBE
- Dr L. C. Purser
- Dr William Crooke, CIE
- W. E. Johnson

== 1924 ==
- Rev. Professor J. F. Bethune-Baker
- Professor G. Baldwin Brown
- Sir E. K. Chambers, KBE, CB
- Professor O. Elton
- Professor F. Llewellyn Griffith
- Professor H. D. Hazeltine
- Professor A. C. Pearson
- A. Hamilton Smith, CB
- Professor N. Kemp Smith
- C. L. Kingsford
- Rev. Dr C. Plummer

== 1925 ==
- Professor H. M. Chadwick
- Professor E. G. Gardner
- Dr T. Rice Holmes
- Professor Ellis H. Minns
- Rev. Canon B. H. Streeter
- Professor George M. Trevelyan, OM, CBE
- Professor H. W. C. Davis, CBE
- Professor L. T. Hobhouse
- Sir Richard Temple, Bt, CB, CIE

== 1926 ==
- Rev. F. E. Brightman
- Dr C. D. Broad
- Dr G. P. Gooch
- Sir C. R. Peers, CBE
- Dr F. C. S. Schiller
- Professor Alexander Souter
- Sir Josiah C. Stamp, GBE
- Professor F. M. Stenton
- Sir T. W. Arnold, CIE
- Dr H. R. H. Hall
- Professor C. H. Herford

== 1927 ==
- Professor J. D. Beazley
- Lord Chalmers, GCB
- Professor R. W. Chambers
- Most Rev. C. F. D'Arcy
- Dr Peter Giles
- Dr J. Rendel Harris
- Professor G. Dawes Hicks
- Professor A. C. Pigou
- Professor F. M. Powicke
- Dr W. D. Ross, OBE
- Professor E. de Sélincourt
- Professor H. W. V. Temperley, OBE
- Professor F. W. Thomas
- Professor C. C. J. Webb
- Dr Thomas Ashby

== 1928 ==
- Professor J. H. Clapham, CBE
- Dr W. W. Greg
- Professor A. Pearce Higgins, CBE, KC
- Dr W. W. Tarn
- Professor A. Hamilton Thompson

== 1929 ==
- Dr G. G. Coulton
- Dr Alan H. Gardiner
- J. M. Keynes, CB
- Dr C. W. Previté-Orton
- A. F. Shand
- Professor D. A. Slater
- Marcus N. Tod, OBE
- The Marquess of Zetland, GCSI, GCIE
- Professor F. de Zulueta

== See also ==
- Fellows of the British Academy
