= List of fellows of the British Academy elected in the 1910s =

The British Academy consists of world-leading scholars and researchers in the humanities and social sciences. Each year, it elects fellows to its membership. The following were elected in the 1910s.

== 1910 ==
- Professor A. C. Bradley
- Professor Gilbert Murray
- Sir Sidney Lee

== 1911 ==
- Professor George Saintsbury
- Professor A. E. Taylor
- Professor T. F. Tout

== 1912 ==
No appointments were made in 1912.

== 1913 ==
- Professor Samuel Alexander, OM
- Professor A. S. Hunt
- Sir George MacDonald, KCB
- Rev. Dr E. A. Abbott
- Sir John MacDonell, KCB
- Sir C. Hercules Read

== 1914 ==
- Lord FitzMaurice
- Dr J. W. MacKail
- Viscount Haldane of Cloan, KT, OM

== 1915 ==
- Principal H. Stuart Jones
- Professor D. S. Margoliouth
- Professor W. R. Scott
- Sir Charles J. Lyall, KCSI
- W. L. Newman
- Sir James H. Ramsay, Bt

== 1916 ==
- Professor A. C. Clark
- Dr L. R. Farnell
- Very Rev. Sir George Adam Smith
- Professor A. A. Bevan
- Professor John Burnet

== 1917 ==
- Sir George A. Grierson, OM, KCIE
- Dr G. F. Hill, CB
- Professor James Smith Reid
- Rt Rev. Bishop Ryle, KCVO

== 1918 ==
- Professor R. Seymour Conway
- Professor G. E. Moore

== 1919 ==
- Dr Paget Toynbee
- Sir Arthur E. Cowley

== See also ==
- Fellows of the British Academy
