= List of fellows of the British Academy elected in the 1960s =

The British Academy consists of world-leading scholars and researchers in the humanities and social sciences. Each year, it elects fellows to its membership. The following were elected in the 1960s.

== 1960 ==
- Professor E. H. Phelps Brown
- Rev. Professor Henry Chadwick
- Sir Oliver Franks
- P. M. Fraser
- Professor E. H. J. Gombrich
- Canon S. L. Greenslade
- R. W. Hamilton
- Professor S. N. Hampshire
- Professor R. F. Kahn
- Lord Nathan of Churt
- Professor M. Roberts
- Professor J. J. Seznec
- R. W. Southern
- P. F. Strawson

== 1961 ==
- Rev. Professor C. K. Barrett
- Dr T. S. R. Boase
- Professor John Brough
- Professor J. E. Butt
- Professor A. K. Cairncross
- Professor J. D. Clark
- Dr R. W. Hunt
- Russell Meiggs
- Margery Perham

== 1962 ==
- Dr R. D. Barnett
- Rev. Professor W. O. Chadwick
- Dr I. E. S. Edwards
- Professor H. L. A. Hart
- Dr Otto Kurz
- M. M. Lascelles
- J. P. Plamenatz
- Professor G. O. Sayles

== 1963 ==
- D. F. Allen
- Dr W. H. Bruford
- Professor Eleanora Carus-Wilson
- H. M. Colvin
- Lord Devlin
- Professor Norman Gash
- Nicholas Kaldor
- Rev. Professor G. W. H. Lampe
- J. B. Leishman
- Professor Bernard Lewis
- Professor A. N. Prior
- T. C. Skeat
- Beryl Smalley

== 1964 ==
- Professor C. O. Brink
- Professor D. V. Glass
- R. M. Hare
- Professor G. W. Keeton
- Professor A. K. S. Lambton
- K. B. McFarlane
- D. Mahon
- Professor E. A. Thompson
- Professor E. M. Wilson

== 1965 ==
- Professor G. C. Allen
- Professor E. Badian
- W. S. Barrett
- Professor A. F. L. Beeston
- C. E. Blunt
- Dr E. S. de Beer
- Professor H. Butterfield
- P. T. Geach
- L. C. B. Gower
- Professor H. J. Habakkuk
- Dr F. Ll. Harrison
- Dr Lilian H. Jeffery
- Professor E. M. Jope
- Professor O. Kahn-Freund
- Rev. Canon J. N. D. Kelly
- Dr C. A. Macartney
- Professor N. B. L. Pevsner
- Professor Kathleen M. Tillotson
- Professor Edward Ullendorf
- Professor T. B. L. Webster

== 1966 ==
- Professor Geoffrey Bullough
- Martin Davies
- V. R. d'A. Desborough
- Professor A. G. Dickens
- Professor K. J. Dover
- Professor Daryll Forde
- Basil Gray
- H. P. Grice
- John Hajnal
- Dr J. E. C. Hill
- Professor R. M. Jackson
- Professor P. H. J. Lloyd-Jones
- Dr C. B. M. McBurney
- Sir Donald MacDougall
- Henry Moore
- Dr J. H. C. Morris
- Rev. Professor C. F. D. Moule
- Dr J. N. L. Myres
- Professor M. J. Oakeshott
- Robert Shackleton
- Professor D. Winton Thomas
- Professor C. H. Wilson
- Professor D. J. Wiseman
- Professor R. C. Zaehner

== 1967 ==
- G. E. M. Anscombe
- J. P. V. D. Balsdon
- Professor W. G. Beasley
- R. N. W. Blake
- A. L. C. Bullock
- John Chadwick
- R. C. Cobb
- Professor A. R. N. Cross
- Rev. Professor F. L. Cross
- Professor H. C. Darby
- Professor G. R. Elton
- Professor Meyer Fortes
- Dr Ilya Gershevitch
- Professor Stephen Korner
- Dr A. H. McDonald
- Professor S. F. C. Milsom
- R. G. M. Nisbet
- W. B. Reddaway
- Dr Audrey I. Richards
- Professor C. M. Robertson
- Professor G. L. S. Shackle
- Professor Geoffrey Tillotson
- Professor D. C. Twitchett
- Dr Margaret D. Whinney
- Dr Frances A. Yates

== 1968 ==
- Professor L. J. Austin
- Professor W. H. B. Court
- M. A. E. Dummett
- Rev. Dr. A. M. Farrer
- Professor F. M. Gluckman
- Professor Malcolm Guthrie
- Professor N. G. L. Hammond
- Professor George Kane
- E. J. Kenney
- R. W. Ketton-Cremer
- Professor W. J. M. Mackenzie
- Professor R. C. O. Matthews
- Professor J. H. Plumb
- Viscount Radcliffe
- Professor J. S. Roskell
- Professor F. H. Sandbach
- Professor J. B. Segal
- Professor Harry Street
- Professor A. D. Trendall
- Professor Walter Ullmann
- Professor George Zarnecki

== 1969 ==
- Prof. Dr. Kurt Aland
- Rev. Professor James Barr
- Professor Eric Birley
- John Boardman
- P. A. Brunt
- Professor Norman Davis
- Professor E. W. Handley
- Professor W. G. Hoskins
- Professor H. G. Johnson
- Dr R. A. Leigh
- Professor C. A. Moser
- Rt Rev. S. C. Neill
- Professor H. G. Nicholas
- Professor G. E. L. Owen
- Professor G. H. N. Seton-Watson
- Dr D. L. Snellgrove
- Professor H. R. Trevor-Roper
- Professor H. W. R. Wade
- Dr J. M. Wallace-Hadrill
- Professor W. H. Walsh
- F. J. Watson

== See also ==
- Fellows of the British Academy
