= W. L. Newman =

British ancient historian and philosopher

William Lambert Newman, FBA (1834–1923) was a British ancient historian and philosopher.

== Early life and education ==
Born on 21 August 1834, Newman was the son of a solicitor from Cheltenham. In 1851, he went up to Balliol College, Oxford, as a scholar (he was also awarded the Hertford scholarship in 1853 and the Ireland scholarship in 1854); he took first class honours in literae humaniores (classics) in 1855 and graduated the following year with a BA.

== Career and work ==
Newman was elected a fellow of Balliol College in 1854 and lectured for the literae humaniores and modern history and law schools from 1858; he developed a reputation as one of the foremost lecturers of his generation at Oxford. In 1868, he was appointed to a university readership, but retired two years later owing to ill health. He retained his fellowship at Balliol until his death, but declined to receive the stipend "for many years". He was called to the bar at Lincoln's Inn in 1867.

While at Oxford, Newman published only one chapter, on land reform, in Questions for a Reformed Parliament (1867); he also advocated reforming the professoriate at Oxford when he gave evidence to a parliamentary select committee that year. In retirement, however, he began work on an edition of Aristotle's Politics, which appeared in four volumes, the first two in 1887 and the last in 1902. This would be "his principal monument", according to the Oxford Dictionary of National Biography: the "whole work belonged to the grand, leisurely type of scholarship, in which even notes have a literary quality ... for soundness of interpretation, copiousness of illustration, and mature wisdom its value was permanent".

Newman was awarded a Doctor of Letters degree by the University of Cambridge in 1900 and was elected a Fellow of the British Academy in 1915. He died on 3 May 1923.
