= David Monro (scholar) =

Scottish Homeric scholar

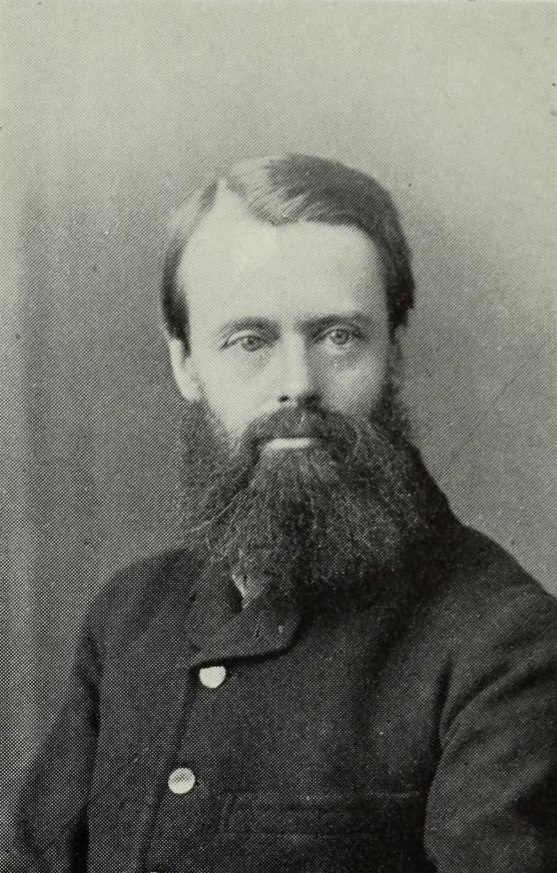
D.B. Monro.

David Binning Monro, FBA (16 November 1836 – 22 August 1905) was a Scottish Homeric scholar, Provost of Oriel College, Oxford, and Vice-Chancellor of Oxford University.

== Life ==
David Monro was born in Edinburgh, the grandson of Alexander Monro tertius, professor of anatomy at the University of Edinburgh, whose own father, Alexander Monro secondus (1733–1817), and grandfather, Alexander Monro primus (1697–1767), had both filled the same position. David Monro was educated at the University of Glasgow, where he was influenced by Edmund Law Lushington to become a classical scholar. In 1854, he attended Brasenose College, Oxford and, later in the same year transferred to Balliol College, Oxford, where he was a Snell exhibitioner. In 1859, he was elected Fellow of Oriel College, Oxford; although he entered Lincoln's Inn the following year, he became lecturer and then tutor at Oriel. In 1882, he became Provost of the College, and he held this office until his death at Heiden, Switzerland. He also served as Vice-Chancellor of the University of Oxford from October 1901 to 1904.

== Academic work ==
Monro was a polymath and polyglot who possessed considerable knowledge of music, painting and architecture. His favourite study was Homer, and his A Grammar of the Homeric Dialect (2nd ed., 1891) established his reputation as an authority on the subject. He edited the last twelve books of the Odyssey, with valuable appendices on the composition of the poem, its relation to the Iliad and the cyclic poets, the history of the text, the dialects, and the Homeric house; a critical text of the poems and fragments (Homeri opera et reliquiae, 1896); Homeri opera (1902, with T. W. Allen, in the Scriptorum Classicorum Bibliotheca Oxoniensis); and an edition of the Iliad with notes for schools.

Monro's article on Homer, written for the 9th edition of the Encyclopædia Britannica, was revised by him for later versions before he died. He also wrote The Modes of Ancient Greek Music (1894).

== Death ==
On 22 August 1905, Monro died of heart disease in Heiden, Switzerland. He is buried in Holywell Cemetery in Oxford.

== Collections ==
Upon Monro's death in 1905, a number of his friends purchased, by subscription, over 1000 volumes from his library in his memory. These works were on Homeric studies and were mainly 19th century. They were presented to the Bodleian Libraries in Oxford.

Monro himself had left Oriel College c.1000 volumes on comparative philology and mythology, most of which are now on permanent loan to the library of the Taylor Institution in Oxford. He left his books on Greek Music and Mathematics, and editions of William Thackeray and Matthew Arnold, to friends.

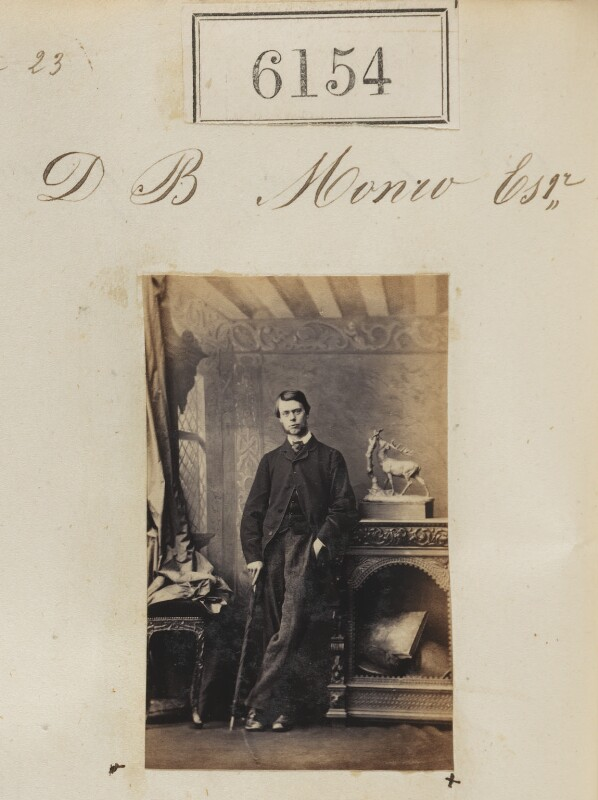
Portrait of David Monro

=== Selected works ===
- A Grammar of the Homeric Dialect (2nd ed., 1891)
- Homer: Iliad, Books I-XII, with an Introduction, a Brief Homeric Grammar, and Notes(3rd ed., 1890)
- Homer: Iliad, Books XIII-XXIV, with Notes (4th ed., 1903)
- The Modes of Ancient Greek Music (1894)

== Sources ==
- John Cook Wilson, David Binning Monro: a short memoir (Oxford, 1907)

Academic offices
Preceded by ?	Provost of Oriel College, Oxford; 1882–1905	Succeeded by ?
Preceded by Thomas Fowler	Vice-Chancellor of Oxford University; 1901–1904	Succeeded by William Walter Merry
