= W. H. B. Court =

William Henry Bassano Court, FBA (12 October 1904 – 30 September 1971), published as W. H. B. Court and known as Harry Court, was an English economic historian.

== Early life and education ==
Court was born on 12 October 1904 in Cirencester; his father was a bookseller. He attended Newbury Grammar School before studying history at Downing College, Cambridge from 1923. Interested in the early economic history of New England, he secured a Choate and Rockefeller fellowship at Harvard University in 1927, where he remained for two years.

== Academic career ==
After his spell at Harvard, he was appointed to a lectureship at the University of Birmingham (and subsequently promoted to a readership), and focused on industrial history, publishing The Rise of the Midland Industries in 1938. During the Second World War, he was temporarily posted in the Ministry of Shipping. In 1947, he was appointed Professor of Economic History at the University of Birmingham, serving until 1970. He was also dean of the Faculty of Commerce and Social Science from 1956 to 1959.

During his time at Birmingham, Court befriended Sir Keith Hancock, and through him secured work on the official History of the Second World War; Court was the author of the volume on Britain's coal industries (published in 1951). He wrote the Concise Economic History of Britain (Cambridge University Press, 1954), and went on to write British Economic History, 1870–1914: Commentary and Documents (1965) and Scarcity and Choice in History (1970). Court was elected a fellow of the British Academy in 1968. He died on 30 September 1970; his wife, Audrey Kathleen, daughter of the Rev. A. E. Brown, CIE, survived him with their three children.
