= Denis Richards =

British historian

Denis Richards OBE (10 September 1910 – 25 November 2004) was a British historian. He is widely known for his work on the history of the Royal Air Force, including the three-volume official history of the service during World War II, which was co-written with Hilary St. George Saunders.

Richards came from London and was educated at Owen's School and Trinity Hall, Cambridge. In 1931 he graduated from Cambridge University with a double first in history. For the next eight years he was a master at Manchester Grammar School, teaching both history and English. From 1939 to 1941 he taught the same subjects at Bradfield College, near Reading, as a senior tutor.

War service then called him and he joined the RAF. Within a very short time he was ordered to report to the historical section of the Air Ministry. His staff eventually came to number 40, and he held the position of senior narrator from 1943 to 1947. He began to write the official history of the RAF during World War II when he was the senior narrator. It was eventually published in three volumes in 1953 and 1954. In 1947 he was promoted within the Air Ministry to a principal, a post in which he remained until 1950. Richards published in his lifetime more than a dozen books, half on RAF history.

After his time in the RAF, and whilst completing the official history, he became involved with Morley College in south London. He worked strenuously to raise funds for the rebuilding of the institution. The college benefitted from paintings he commissioned, and many young musicians later to find fame, took part in concerts he staged.

He had a number of hobbies, including snooker and golf. He was heavily involved with Hampstead Golf Club after joining it in 1951. He also engaged in voluntary work, chairing the Women's League for Health and Beauty for 22 years between 1966 and 1988 and also acting as a vice president of the Purcell School of Young Musicians from 1984 until his death. He continued to publish works into his old age, and he was awarded the OBE in 1990.
