= List of fellows of the British Academy elected in the 1940s =

The British Academy consists of world-leading scholars and researchers in the humanities and social sciences. Each year, it elects fellows to its membership. The following were elected in the 1940s.

== 1940 ==
- Dr Z. N. Brooke
- Rev. M. P. Charlesworth
- Professor V. Gordon Childe
- Sir Cyril Fox
- C. J. Gadd
- Dr E. Prestage
- Professor D. S. Robertson
- Dr W. A. Shaw
- Lord Wright

== 1941 ==
- J. Allan
- Dr A. B. Cook
- Dr A. C. Ewing
- Professor E. Fraenkel
- T. D. Kendrick
- F. J. E. Raby
- K. Sisam
- Sidney Smith
- Professor H. T. Wade-Gery
- Dr R. E. Mortimer Wheeler

== 1942 ==
- Dr E. R. Bevan
- Professor E. R. Dodds
- Dr J. L. le B. Hammond
- Professor J. R. Hicks
- Professor L. C. Robbins
- E. S. G. Robinson
- Professor R. L. Turner

== 1943 ==
- Christopher Dawson
- J. Goronwy Edwards
- A. S. F. Gow
- Professor Battiscombe Gunn
- Professor H. H. Price
- Professor F. P. Wilson

== 1944 ==
- Dr C. K. Allen
- Professor H. W. Bailey
- G. Caton Thompson
- Professor H. A. R. Gibb
- Professor F. A. von Hayek
- Dr F. E. Hutchinson
- Dr W. H. S. Jones
- Professor R. A. B. Mynors
- Professor L. B. Namier
- Dr F. Saxl
- Ronald Syme
- Harold Williams

== 1945 ==
- Professor B. H. Sumner
- Helen Cam
- Professor T. W. Manson
- A. D. Waley
- Sir R. O. Winstedt
- E. F. Carritt
- Professor G. C. Cheshire
- Professor A. J. B. Wace

== 1946 ==
- Sir A. Carr-Saunders
- Rev. C. H. Dodd
- Professor S. R. K. Glanville
- Professor R. Hackforth
- Professor E. F. Jacob
- H. Mattingly
- Professor H. J. Paton
- Professor T. F. T. Plucknett
- Professor W. L. Renwick
- Professor E. Ll. Woodward

== 1947 ==
- Sir E. Barker
- O. G. S. Crawford
- Professor K. A. C. Creswell
- H. Darbishire
- Sir C. Flower
- Professor A. W. Gomme
- R. F. Harrod
- Professor A. H. M. Jones
- Professor M. D. Knowles
- I. A Richmond
- C. H. Roberts
- Professor H. H. Rowley
- Rev. J. M. Thompson
- Professor B. Willey

== 1948 ==
- Professor Sir Reginald Coupland
- Professor G. C. Field
- Professor C. F. C. Hawkes
- Professor Sir Hubert Henderson
- Dr P. E. Kahle
- Rev. Dr W. L. Knox
- Professor H. Lauterpacht
- W. A. Pantin
- Professor R. Pares
- Rev. Professor C. E. Raven
- Professor Leon Roth
- Dr J. V. Scholderer
- F. Wormald

== 1949 ==
- Professor A. J. Arberry
- Dr R. W. Chapman
- Sir Kenneth Clark
- Professor David Douglas
- Professor R. W. Firth
- Rev. Dr W. F. Howard
- Professor J. E. Neale
- Dr Rudolf Pfeiffer
- A. E. Popham

== See also ==
- Fellows of the British Academy
