= History of the Second World War =

Official history of the British contribution to the Second World War

The History of the Second World War is the official history of the British contribution to the Second World War and was published by Her Majesty's Stationery Office (HMSO). The immense project was sub-divided into areas to ease publication, United Kingdom Military Series, the United Kingdom Civil Series for the civilian war effort; the Foreign Policy series, the Intelligence series and the Medical series are eponymous. Other volumes not under the aegis of the series but published by HMSO may be read as adjuncts, covering matters not considered in great detail or at all, in one case, in the main series. Further volumes, published after the privatisation of HMSO or in the series about the Special Operations Executive, are also useful.

The volumes were intended to be read individually, rather than in series, which led to some overlapping. In their introductions to their parts of the series, Sir Keith Hancock and Sir James Butler wrote that this was to obviate a need to read more volumes than those covering that part of the war effort. Hancock edited the Civil Series and Butler the Military Series. The first volume appeared in 1949 and the last in 1993, with a revised edition of one volume appearing in 2004. An unorthodox decision was to cover the conflict from a theatre of operations point of view rather than by service, to acknowledge that military operations were intimately linked.

The works published before 1970 lack references to unpublished sources until government archives were opened, to an extent, by the Public Records Act 1958 and the Public Records Act 1967. The works were published with only references to published sources because British constitutional conventions on the anonymity of government officials and ministers were followed, leading to a somewhat detached narrative style in some cases. A parallel series of volumes for official use were printed, which referenced the unpublished sources in manuscript, in red ink. A few official copies 'escaped' into public libraries and these additions can be seen.

== Volumes ==
=== United Kingdom Military Series ===
- Grand Strategy
  - Volume I, Norman Gibbs, 1976
  - Volume II, Sir James Butler, 1957
  - Volume III, Part 1, J. M. A. Gwyer, 1964
  - Volume III, Part 2, Sir James Butler, 1964
  - Volume IV, Sir Michael Howard, 1970
  - Volume V, John Ehrman, 1956
  - Volume VI, John Ehrman, 1956
- The War at Sea
  - Volume I: The Defensive, Captain Stephen Roskill, 1954
  - Volume II: The Period of Balance, Captain Stephen Roskill, 1956
  - Volume III, Part 1: The Offensive, Captain Stephen Roskill, 1960
  - Volume III, Part 2: The Offensive, Captain Stephen Roskill, 1961
- The Strategic Air Offensive against Germany
  - Volume I: Preparation, Sir Charles Webster and Noble Frankland, 1961
  - Volume II: Endeavour, Sir Charles Webster and Noble Frankland, 1961
  - Volume III: Victory, Sir Charles Webster and Noble Frankland, 1961
  - Volume IV: Annexes and Appendices, Sir Charles Webster and Noble Frankland, 1961
- Defence of the United Kingdom, Basil Collier, 1957
- The Campaign in Norway, Thomas Derry, 1952 (transcribed HTML copy)
- The War in France and Flanders, 1939–40, Major Lionel Ellis, 1954 (transcribed HTML copy)
- Victory in the West
  - Volume I: Battle of Normandy, Major L. F. Ellis, G.R.G Allen and A.E. Warhurst, 1962
  - Volume II: Defeat of Germany, Major L. F. Ellis et al., 1968
- War against Japan
  - Volume I: The Loss of Singapore, Major-General Stanley Kirby et al., 1957
  - Volume II: India's Most Dangerous Hour, Major-General Stanley Kirby et al., 1958
  - Volume III: The Decisive Battles, Major-General Stanley Kirby et al., 1961
  - Volume IV: The Reconquest of Burma, Major-General Stanley Kirby et al., 1965
  - Volume V: The Surrender of Japan, Major-General Stanley Kirby et al., 1969
- The Mediterranean and Middle East
  - Volume I: The Early Successes against Italy, to May 1941, Major-General I. S. O. Playfair, Commander G.M.S. Stitt, RN, Brigadier C.J.C. Molony, Air Vice-Marshal S.E. Toomer., 1954
  - Volume II: The Germans Come to the Help of Their Ally, 1941, Major-General I. S. O. Playfair, Captain F.C. Flynn, RN, Brigadier C.J.C. Molony, Air Vice-Marshal S.E. Toomer., 1956
  - Volume III: British Fortunes Reach Their Lowest Ebb, Major-General I. S. O. Playfair et al., 1960
  - Volume IV: The Destruction of the Axis Forces in Africa, Major-General I. S. O. Playfair, Brigadier Charles Molony et al., 1966
  - Volume V: The Campaign in Sicily, 1943 and the Campaign in Italy, 3 September 1943 to 31 March 1944, Brigadier Charles Molony et al., 1973
  - Volume VI, Part 1: Victory in the Mediterranean: 1 April to 4 June 1944, General Sir William Jackson et al., 1984
  - Volume VI, Part 2: Victory in the Mediterranean: June to October 1944, General Sir William Jackson et al., 1987
  - Volume VI, Part 3: Victory in the Mediterranean: November 1944 to May 1945, General Sir William Jackson et al., 1988
- Civil Affairs and Military Government
  - Central Organisation and Planning, Frank Donnison, 1966
  - British Military Administration in the Far East, 1943–46, Frank Donnison, 1956
  - North-West Europe, 1944–46, Frank Donnison, 1961
  - Allied Military Administration of Italy, 1943-1945, Charles Harris, 1957
  - British Military Administration of Occupied Territories in Africa during the Years 1941–1947, Major-General Francis Rodd, 1948

=== United Kingdom Civil Series ===
- Introductory
  - British War Economy., Keith Hancock and Margaret Gowing, 1949
  - Statistical Digest of the War, Central Statistical Office, 1949 (partially transcribed HTML copy)
  - Problems of Social Policy, Richard Titmuss, 1950 (transcribed HTML copy)
  - British War Production, Michael Postan, 1952 (transcribed HTML copy)
- General Series
  - Coal, W. B. Court, 1951
  - Oil: A Study of Wartime Policy and Administration, D. J. Payton-Smith, 1971
  - Studies in the Social Services, Sheila Ferguson, 1978
  - Civil Defence, T. H. O'Brien, 1955
  - Works and Buildings, C. M. Kohan, 1952
  - Food
    - Volume I: The Growth of Policy, R. J. Hammond, 1951
    - Volume II: Studies in Administration and Control, R. J. Hammond, 1956
    - Volume III: Studies in Administration and Control, R. J. Hammond, 1962
  - Agriculture, K. A. H. Murray, 1955
  - The Economic Blockade
    - Volume I, William Medlicott, 1952
    - Volume II, William Medlicott, 1957
  - Inland Transport, Christopher Savage, 1957
  - Merchant Shipping and the Demands of War, Betty Behrens, 1955
  - North American Supply, H. Duncan Hall, 1955
  - Manpower: Study of War-Time Policy and Administration, H. M. D. Parker, 1957
  - Civil Industry and Trade, Eric Hargreaves, 1952
  - Financial Policy, 1939–45, Richard Sayers, 1956
- War Production
  - Labour in the Munitions Industries, P. Inman, 1957
  - The Control of Raw Materials, Joel Hurstfield, 1953
  - The Administration of War Production, J. D. Scott, 1955
  - Design and Development of Weapons: Studies in Government and Industrial Organisation, Michael Postan, Denys Hay, John Dick Scott, Keith Hancock (ed.) 1964
  - Factories and Plant, William Hornby, 1958
  - Contracts and Finance, William Ashworth, 1953
  - Studies of Overseas Supply, H. Duncan Hall, 1956

=== Foreign Policy ===
- British Foreign Policy in the Second World War
  - Volume I, Sir Llewellyn Woodward, 1970
  - Volume II, Sir Llewellyn Woodward, 1971
  - Volume III, Sir Llewellyn Woodward, 1971
  - Volume IV, Sir Llewellyn Woodward, 1975
  - Volume V, Sir Llewellyn Woodward, 1976
  - Abridged Version, Sir Llewellyn Woodward, 1962

=== Intelligence ===
- British Intelligence in the Second World War
  - Volume I: Its Influence on Strategy and Operations, F. H. Hinsley, E. E. Thomas, C. F. G. Ransom, R. C. Knight, 1979
  - Volume II: Its Influence on Strategy and Operations, F. H. Hinsley, E. E. Thomas, C. F. G. Ransom, R. C. Knight, 1981
  - Volume III, Part 1: Its Influence on Strategy and Operations, F. H. Hinsley, E. E. Thomas, C. F. G. Ransom, R. C. Knight, 1984
  - Volume III, Part 2: Its Influence on Strategy and Operations, F. H. Hinsley, E. E. Thomas, C. F. G. Ransom, R. C. Knight, 1988
  - Volume IV: Security and Counter-Intelligence, F. H. Hinsley, E. E. Thomas, C. F. G. Ransom, R. C. Knight, 1990
  - Volume V: Strategic Deception, Michael Howard, 1990
  - Abridged Version, F. H. Hinsley, 1993
- SOE in France, M. R. D. Foot, 1966 (repr. 2004)

=== Medical Volumes ===
- The Emergency Medical Services
  - Volume I: England and Wales, edited by Cuthbert Dunn, 1952
  - Volume II: Scotland, Northern Ireland and Principal Air Raids on Industrial Centres in Great Britain, edited by Cuthbert Dunn, 1953
- The Royal Air Force Medical Services
  - Volume I: Administration, edited by S. C. Rexford-Welch, 1954
  - Volume II: Command, edited by S. C. Rexford-Welch, 1955
  - Volume III: Campaigns, edited by S. C. Rexford-Welch, 1958
- The Royal Naval Medical Service
  - Volume I: Administration, Jack Coulter, 1953
  - Volume II: Operations, Jack Coulter, 1955
- The Army Medical Services
  - Administration
    - Volume I, Francis Crew, 1953
    - Volume II, Francis Crew, 1955
  - Campaigns
    - Volume I: France and Belgium, 1939–40, Norway, Battle of Britain, Libya, 1940–42, East Africa, Greece, 1941, Crete, Iraq, Syria, Persia, Madagascar, Malta, Francis Crew, 1956
    - Volume II: Hong Kong, Malaya, Iceland and the Faroes, Libya, 1942–43, North-West Africa, Francis Crew, 1957
    - Volume III: Sicily, Italy, Greece (1944–45), Francis Crew, 1959
    - Volume IV: North-West Europe, Francis Crew, 1962
    - Volume V: Burma, Francis Crew, 1966
- The Civilian Health and Medical Services
  - Volume I: The Civilian Health Services; Other Civilian Health and Medical Services, Arthur MacNalty, 1953
  - Volume II: The Colonies, the Medical Services of the Ministry of Pensions, Public Health in Scotland, Public Health in Northern Ireland, Arthur MacNalty, 1955
- Medical Services at War: The Principal Lessons of the Second World War, Arthur MacNalty, 1968
- Medicine and Pathology, Zachary Cope, 1952
- Surgery, Zachary Cope, 1953
- Medical Research, edited by F. H. K. Green and Major-General Sir Gordon Covell, 1953
- Casualties and Medical Statistics, edited by William Franklin, 1972

=== Supplementary HMSO works ===
- The Royal Air Force, 1939–45
  - Volume I: Fight at Odds, Denis Richards, 1953 (transcribed HTML copy)
  - Volume II: Fight Avails, Denis Richards and Hilary St George Saunders, 1953 (transcribed HTML copy)
  - Volume III: Fight is Won, Hilary St George Saunders, 1954 (transcribed HTML copy)

== Other official departmental histories ==
A number of official histories were produced by government departments. The authors worked under the same conditions and had the same access to official files but their works did not appear in the History of the Second World War.

- Britain and Atomic Energy 1939–1945 Margaret Gowing, 1964.

== Supplementary works from other publishers ==
- SOE Histories
  - SOE in the Far East, Charles Cruikshank, 1983
  - SOE in Scandinavia, Charles Cruikshank, 1986
  - SOE in the Low Countries, M. R. D. Foot, 2001
- Secret Flotillas
  - Volume I: Clandestine Sea Operations to Brittany 1940–44, Sir Brooks Richards, 2004
  - Volume II: Clandestine Sea Operations in the Mediterranean, North Africa and the Adriatic 1940–44, Sir Brooks Richards, 2004
- Army Series, printed by the War Office, 30 volumes
  - Royal Electrical and Mechanical Engineers
    - Volume I Organisation and Operations, Rowcroft, E. Bertram (1951)
    - Volume II Technical, Bloor, F. R. (1951)
  - Supplies and Transport 2 volumes, Boileau, D. W. (1954)
  - Works service and Engineer stores, Buchanan, A. G. B. (1953)
  - Fighting, support and transport vehicles and the War Office provision for their provision
    - Part 1 Common Problems, Campagnac R. & Hayman P. E. G. (1951)
    - Part 2 Unarmoured Vehicles, Campagnac R. & Hayman P. E. G. (1951)
  - Maintenance in the field 2 volumes, Carter, J. A. H. (1952)
  - Maps and Survey, Clough, A. B. (1952)
  - The Auxiliary Territorial Service, Cowper, J. M. (1949)
  - Movements, Higham, J. B. & Knighton, E. A. (1955)
  - Signal Communications, Gravely, T. B. (1950)
  - Quartering, Magnay, A. D. (1949)
  - Miscellaneous Q services, Magnay, A. D. (1954)
  - Mobilization, McPherson, A. B. (1950)
  - Discipline, McPherson, A. B. (1950)
  - Transportation, Micklem, R. (1950)
  - Army welfare, Morgan, M. C. (1953)
  - Ordnance services, Officers of the directorate (1950)
  - Airborne Forces, Oatway, T. B. H. (1951)
  - The development of artillery, tactics and equipment, Pemberton, A. L. (1950)
  - Manpower problems, Pigott, A. J. K. (1949)
  - Army Radar, Sayer, A. P. (1950)
  - Morale, Sparrow, J. H. A. (1949)
  - Personnel selection, Ungerson, B. (1952)
  - Military Engineering (field), Pakenham-Walsh, R. P. (1952)
  - Administrative planning, Wilson, H. W. (1952)
  - Special Weapons and types of warfare 3 volumes, Wiseman, D. J. C. (1951–53)
    - Volume I Gas Warfare
    - Volume II Screening smoke, signal smoke, flame warfare insecticide & insect repellent & special common use equipment
    - Volume III Visual & Sonic warfare
- Royal Air Force Series, printed by the Air Ministry
  - Airborne Forces (1951)
  - Air/Sea Rescue (1952)
  - Air Support (1956)
  - Armament
    - Volume I Bombs & Bombing Equipment (1952)
    - Volume II Guns, Gunsights, Turrets, Ammunition and Pyrotechnics (1954)
  - Maintenance (1954)
  - Signals
    - Volume I Organisation and Development (1958)
    - Volume II Telecommunications (1958)
    - Volume III Aircraft Radio (1956)
    - Volume IV Radar in Raid Reporting (1950)
    - Volume V Fighter Control and Interception (1952)
    - Volume VI Radio in Maritime Warfare (1954)
    - Volume VII Radio Counter-Measures (1950)
  - Works (1956)

== See also ==
- Actes et documents du Saint Siège relatifs à la Seconde Guerre Mondiale, official document collection of Vatican City pertaining to World War II
- Australia in the War of 1939–1945, official war history of Australia
- Germany and the Second World War (Das Deutsche Reich und der Zweite Weltkrieg), semi-official German history
- Official History of New Zealand in the Second World War 1939–45, official war history of New Zealand
- Official war histories of the United States
  - The Army Air Forces in World War II
  - United States Army in World War II
- The Kingdom of the Netherlands During World War II, official war history of the Netherlands
- The Second World War by Winston Churchill
