= Thomas William Allen =

English classical scholar (1862–1950)

Thomas William Allen FBA
- Allen in June 1939
- Born: 9 May 1862; London, England
- Died: 30 April 1950 (aged 87)
- Education: The Queen's College, Oxford
- Scientific career
- Fields: Ancient Greek literature, Palaeography
- Workplaces: University College London; The Queen's College, Oxford
- Academic advisors: Alfred Goodwin (1849–1892)
- Notable students: John Jackson (1881–1952)

Thomas William Allen, FBA (9 May 1862 – 30 April 1950) was an English classicist, scholar of Ancient Greek and palaeographer. He was a fellow of The Queen's College, Oxford, from 1890 until his death sixty years later. He is best known for his editions of Homer for Oxford Classical Texts and work on Greek palaeography.

== Early life and education ==
Allen was born on 9 May 1862 at 103 Camden Road Villas, Camden Town, London, the eldest child of Thomas Bull Allen, a wholesale tea dealer, and his wife Amelia Le Lacheur, daughter of William Le Lacheur. His sister Edith married another classicist John Percival Postgate, who was her tutor at Girton College, Cambridge. Details about Allen's upbringing are lacking, but he was educated at Amersham School and by private tutors before going up to University College London in 1880. In June of the next year he was elected to a classical scholarship at The Queen's College, Oxford, matriculating on 28 October 1881. He earned honours: first class in Mods (Honour Moderations) 1882 and first class in Literae Humaniores 1885. After receiving his B.A. in 1885 he was made a Fellow of University College London the same year, a rare honour. He began teaching, standing in as a temporary professor of Humanity in the University of Edinburgh for the 1885–6 school year.

== Academia and research ==
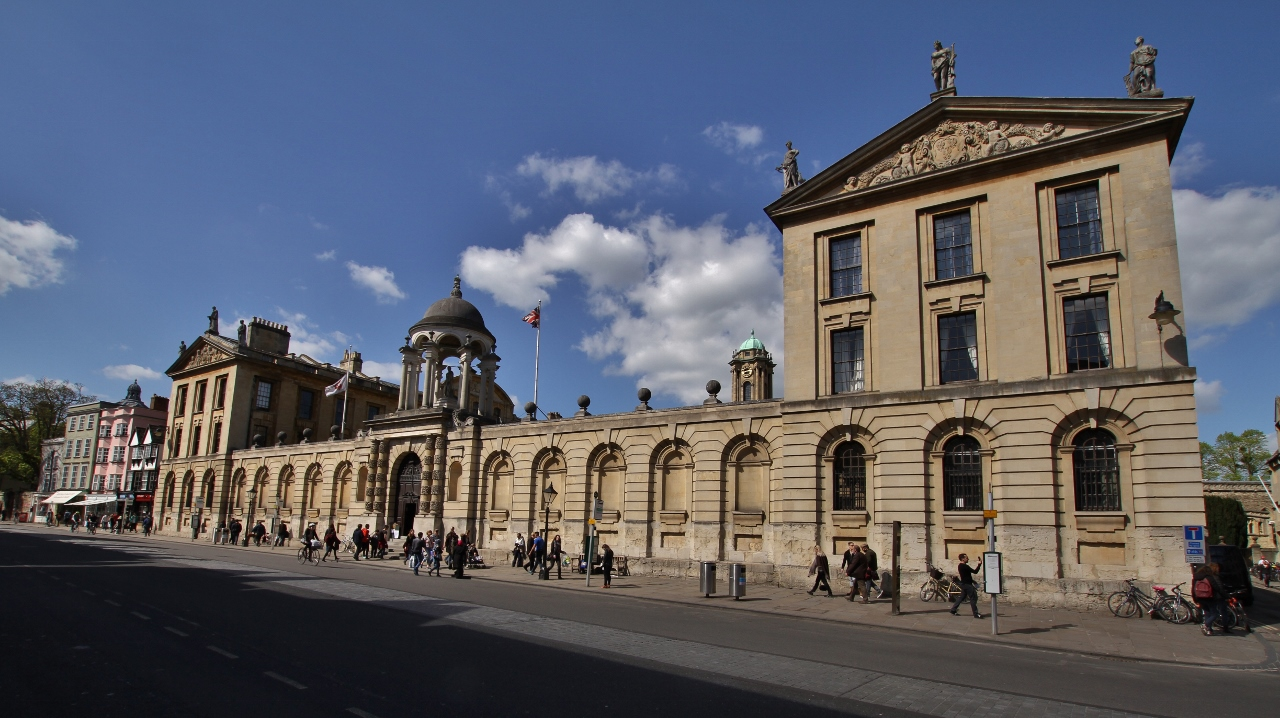
The Queen's College, Oxford, where Allen spent his entire career.

Allen became keenly interested in Greek manuscripts and published his first notes on the subject in 1887. He would later write in the preface to his magnum opus: "My interest in palaeography and philology began with the man to whom I dedicate this book, my only teacher." That man was Alfred Goodwin (1849–1892), Professor of Greek at University College London. Allen also dedicated his first book Notes on Abbreviations in Greek Manuscripts (1889) to him. Goodwin was much respected and was considered by many to be a remarkable and stimulating teacher. (Note: Goodwin was originally appointed Professor of Latin in 1867, but in 1879-80 he was also appointed Professor of Greek. The combined professorships proved too much and he was solely Professor of Greek from 1880-89. He once again tried the combined professorships in 1889, but again it proved too much and led to his premature death a couple of years later. The Latin Chair was filled by the great A. E. Housman; see Richard Perceval Graves, A. E. Housman: The Scholar-Poet (Faber & Faber, 2014), 82-83; Faculties of Arts and Sciences, Notes and Materials for the History of University College, London, (London: H. K. Lewis, 1898), 18-22.) Allen became a close friend and assisted Goodwin in his work on a new edition of the Homeric Hymns by collating a number of manuscripts. Goodwin had conceived the edition as a two-volume production, with text and commentary, but after his premature death, only notes to about four hundred lines of the text could be located. Allen was asked to assume responsibility for seeing what remained through the press, a task that entailed considerable labour on his part, though out of modesty he omitted his name from the title page (Hymni Homerici, ed. Goodwin [Oxford, 1893]).

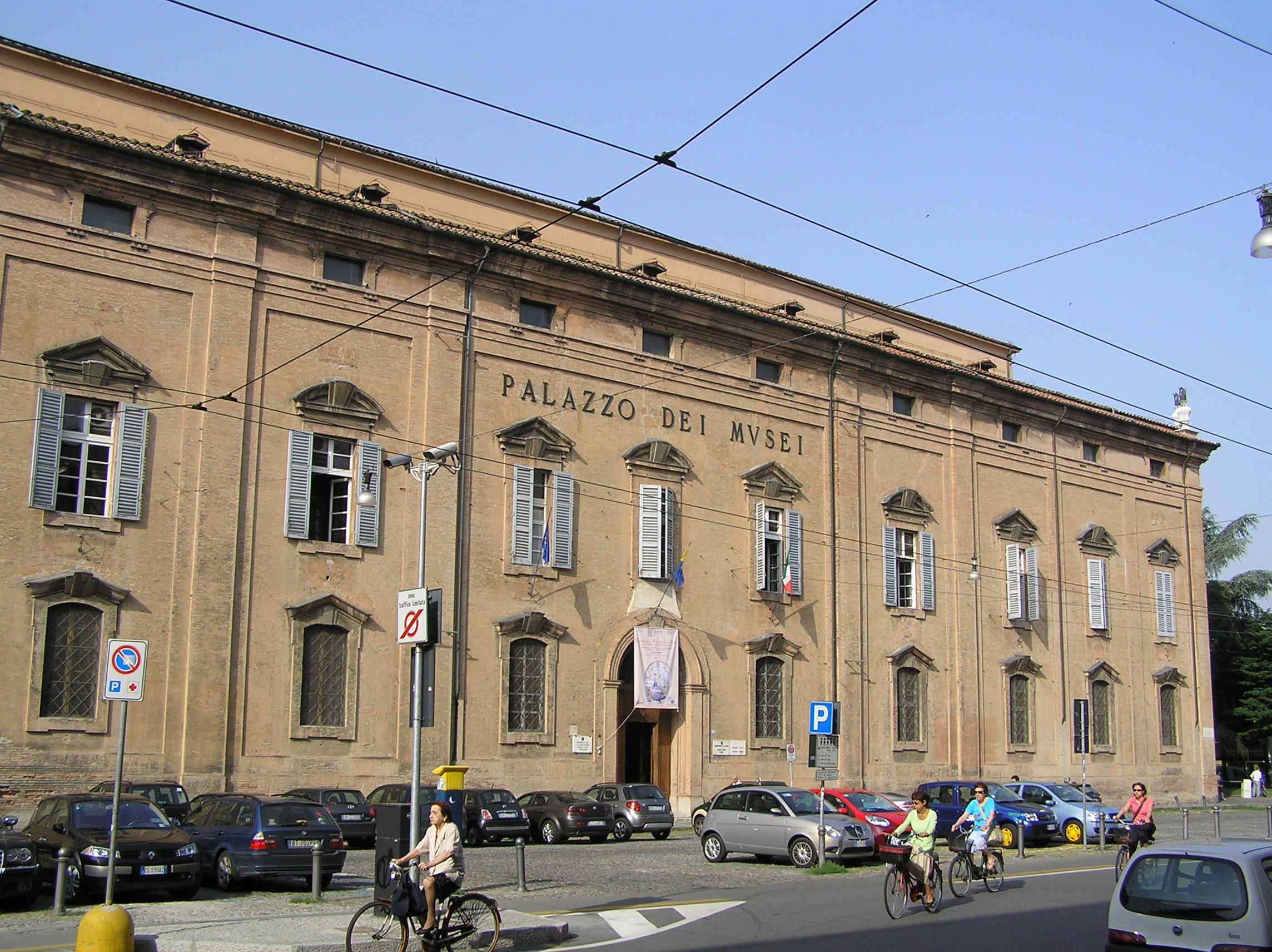
The Palazzo dei Musei in Modena, home of the famed Biblioteca Estense, which Allen visited in 1888.

In the Michaelmas Term 1887 Allen was elected to a Craven Fellowship at Oxford. Under the new scheme of 1886, the Craven Fellow was to receive £200 annually for two years and was "required to spend at least eight months of each year of his tenure of the Fellowship in residence abroad for the purpose of study at some place or places approved by the electing Committee." Allen had proposed to the electors three lines of study: "a collation of MSS. of the Iliad, a collection of materials bearing upon palaeography generally, and, in cases where is seemed useful, cataloguing of manuscripts." He followed his proposal and spent the bulk of 1888 and 1889 primarily in Italy combing the libraries for relevant manuscripts. (Note: Some sixty years later, the classical scholar Douglas Young made a similar journey scouring the European libraries for Theognis manuscripts. Before setting off, he consulted with Allen and found him "full of reminiscence of several of the Dutch and Italian libraries I was aiming to visit." Allen cautioned him: "On no account, my dear sir, drink the wine of Modena. Lambrusco they call it. Only fit for gondoliers" (Douglas Young, Chasing an Ancient Greek: Discursive Reminiscences of an [sic] European Journey [London: Hollis & Carter, 1950], 9). Young provides a glimpse into what he and Allen faced: "[M]any catalogues are defective or inaccurate, without indices, or with indices whose items stray from the order of the alphabet. Few things are more baffling than to peruse, in the hope of a reference to some part of the author one seeks, an unindexed account in Bulgarian of the manuscript collection of some Balkan monastery, which has subsequently been sacked by Greeks or Turks. It may prove that a famous library with hundreds of Greek manuscripts contains none of your particular pet. Then you find that in a collection of only two MSS. in a minor repository one is to your purpose. Whereupon you must confirm with the librarian whether the catalogue is right and the MS. still exists, or has been burned, stolen, or mislaid, the last a possibility of frequent occurrence" (ibid., 2-3). Finally, in defense of Modena and its Lambrusco, Young writes: "Not only did I much relish this altogether unclassifiable wine, but the food and the company were excellent as well" (ibid., 107).) His first book Notes on Abbreviations in Greek Manuscripts (1889) offered the result of his palaeographical investigations and was well received by England's greatest expert on the subject Sir Edward Maunde Thompson. Although not a comprehensive work, it was then the best study of the topic in English and is still a useful guide for students. The next year he would publish his second book Notes on Greek Manuscripts in Italian Libraries (1890), which offered useful "rough lists," providing pertinent details not available in published catalogues, which were often inadequate, or did not exist. The Convocation at Oxford had authorized an expenditure of £500 for the production of the report, the large sum being indicative of their satisfaction with his first publication. (Note: Allen says (1931, 1:vii) that funding after the Craven Fellowship was continued "by a grant which lasted till 1894." Whether this is the £500 mentioned above is not clear.) Not only were these trips productive in terms of providing the young scholar with a wealth of palaeographical experience, but at the end of his travels, while in Florence, he would meet his future wife Miss Laura Hope. Following these labors he was awarded a M.A. in 1889 and elected Fellow of The Queen's College in 1890. As for the latter election, the Senior Tutor at the time wrote that it "was made without examination, a compliment which has never before been paid to anyone by this college.

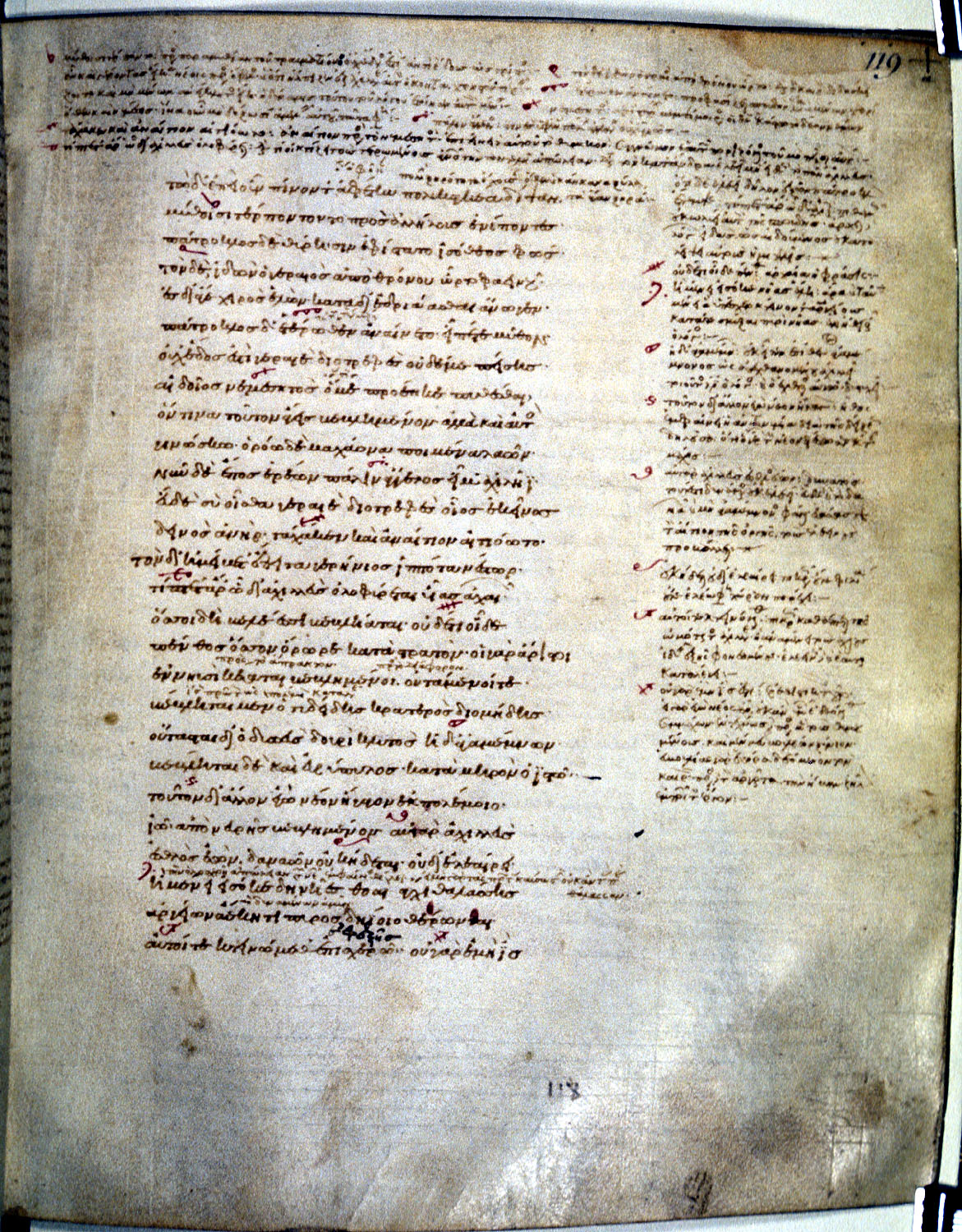
Folio from the Townley Homer, an 11th cent. MS. of the Iliad in the British Library.

In the 1890s Allen focused his labours on what would be his life's work, the texts of Homer and the Homeric Hymns. During the latter part of the decade he began a working relationship with David B. Monro, a leading Homeric scholar and Provost of Oriel College, Oxford. (Note: Allen contributed a small sketch of Monro as a scholar: "What distinguished Monro's Homeric work from that of other Englishmen of his generation was, in the first place, his knowledge of Comparative Grammar or Philology. When he began to write on Homer he was almost alone in this possession, and at his death there are few members of his own University who have a first-hand knowledge of Comparative Philology. ... In these matters his method was very much that of Aristarchus, who, so far as we can gather, did not admit a correction into the Vulgate of his day, unless diplomatic authority could be found for it. Monro, indeed, in many respects, resembled that most judicious of ancient critics. Besides this he was a great exegete, and had a sure knowledge both of Greek and of Homeric usage" (John Cook Wilson, David Binning Monro: A Short Memoir [Oxford: Clarendon Press, 1907], 15-16). Allen also contributed a couple of paragraphs to Monro's revised entry on Homer for the 11th ed. of the Encyclopaedia Britannica, 17:626-39, at 631-32.) In 1896 Monro published his Homeric text Homeri Opera et reliquiae, which included the version of the Homeric Hymns that Allen had edited three years earlier. At the start of the next year, the Delegates of Oxford University Press announced "a standard and uniform series" of "Oxford Classical Texts", with the responsibility for Homer being assigned to Monro and Allen. The fruit of their collaboration would be published five years later, a two-volume edition of the Iliad, Homeri Opera I-II (1902). During this decade Allen was struggling financially, and as a result was forced to delay his wedding four years until 1894. Even then, after they moved into their new residence at 6 Canterbury Road, his wife's aunt and sister took part of the house and contributed towards expenses. Allen twice applied for more remunerative positions, first for the chair of Humanity at the University of Edinburgh in 1891 and then for the chair of Greek at the University of Glasgow in 1899, both of which he failed to obtain. Fortunately, he was appointed a visiting lecturer at Royal Holloway College in 1893, a position he held until 1918, and which would bring in additional monies.

Allen's 1912 edition of the Homeric Hymns

In the first decades of the twentieth century Allen published his editions of Homeric texts. He brought out revised versions of his Oxford Classical Text of the Iliad (2nd ed., 1908; 3rd ed. 1920), the Odyssey (1st ed. 1908; 2nd ed. 1917/1919), and the Homeric Hymns (1912). He collaborated with E. E. Sikes, M.A., Fellow and Tutor of St John's College, Cambridge, to bring out an edition of the Homeric Hymns (1904) with an English introduction and running commentary. He produced a similar edition (with commentary) of the Catalogue of Ships (1921), a catalogue in Book 2 of Homer's Iliad (2.494-759), which lists the contingents of the Achaean army that sailed to Troy. Finally, in 1931 he published his edito maior of the Iliad, a three-volume work, with the first volume containing solely introductory materials (in English). All of his editions of Homer were praised at the time and were the products of years of labour, but they have subsequently been criticized; Nigel Wilson has suggested that his "classification of the Iliad manuscripts was essentially flawed ... There is so much inaccuracy in what Allen states ... that one cannot trust him at all". Despite this criticism, they remain in print as the official Oxford edition. His only monograph was Homer: The Origins and the Transmission (1924), a collection of his more important articles, revised and augmented. In the preface he offers a frank assessment: "Time was when I intended to write a book on Homer, a continuous book which should cover the whole subject and solve the whole question—his age, personality, method, theme ... As time went on I was discouraged by the failure, so it seemed to me, of my contemporaries, English and foreign, and by the discovery of my own incapacity. I should like to put this last down to the drawbacks of the teaching profession (which are real) and the tutor's rusty pen. But I cannot conceal from myself that I might have overcome these obstacles had I been more of what literary people call in their own case a creative artist" (p. 5). He was elected a Fellow of the British Academy in 1922.

Allen was a very conservative text critic. Two years after his publication of Goodwin's edition, he offered a "sequel" that was to provide the text-critical principles he had followed. He first characterizes the efforts of earlier editors: "The Greek classics have been read, studied, and edited for above four hundred years; the simple and easy corrections that the early editors, Greeks and Italians, made in their texts have been followed by the more learned but of necessity less and less certain attempts of Frenchmen, Dutchmen, Germans, English, who have provided every ancient writer with an accumulation of alternative readings which exceeds in bulk his own words." He then offers his own criteria for textual emendation: "To lay down the canons that determine a good emendation is not an easy task. I will content myself with stating one principle, not the only one, but that which is in most danger of being overlooked, namely, that no emendation is certain the passing of which into the actual documentary reading cannot be explained according to recognized graphical laws. If this condition be unfulfilled, not the most brilliant or witty substitute for the text can be accepted. The datum, the evidence given by the MSS., is that from which we start, and to which we come back; to depart therefrom is to compose, to rewrite the author, to write better than the author. We are tied by the document, and within the radius of graphical change about it lies the field for our invention." (Note: Allen really did not change his views on textual emendation, for in his last, posthumously-published piece concerning the text of Theognis he wrote: "Critics who had no conception of what a poet's thoughts and feelings are, what he puts into verse and how he puts it, have both misunderstood Theognis and made monstrous alterations in this text. He has been, like practically all Greek authors, the prey of insufferable busybodies, people who cannot leave well alone, and who, starting from a small knowledge of Greek and none of the world, have pawed our texts over till what we read is more German and Dutch than the language they profess" ("Theognis, ed. Diehl 1936". Revue de Philologie 76 (1950): 135-36).)

== Personal ==
Allen married Laura Charlotte Hope, the eldest daughter of William Hope, a recipient of the Victoria Cross for bravery during the Crimean War, and his wife Margaret Graham. They were engaged on 27 February 1890, a couple of months after they had met in Florence, but would not marry until 1894. They had one child, a daughter, Charlotte Allen, born in 1896. Mrs. Allen would become a devoted member of the newly formed Christian Science movement, which had only begun to hold public services in London the year that Charlotte was born. It is not clear what T. W. Allen's religious beliefs were, but apparently he was never baptized, a neglect that apparently cost him a Studentship at Christ Church, Oxford. Unfortunately, it was his wife's adherence to the tenets of the new healing faith from America that resulted in the great disaster of his life. In December 1919, twenty-three-year-old Charlotte became critically ill and died, the tragic result of following the rule to not seek medical help for illness. (Note: From 1898 till the start of World War I, there were a number of cases of "death by Christian Science," which came before coroners and sometimes went to court, though no practitioner was ever convicted. These cases were reported both in medical journals and the popular press. For details, see Claire F. Gartrell-Mills, "Christian Science: an American Religion in Britain, 1895 - 1940" (Ph.D. diss., Oxford, 1991), 210-30. One of the earliest notices in the British Medical Journal tried to sound a warning: "The occurrence in quick succession of two inquests on persons who have died under the so-called 'Christian Science' treatment, has probably made known to many people for the first time the existence in our midst of a system of quackery at once more foolish and more pernicious than any of the many follies and frauds which flourish in rank luxuriance on the 'eternal gullible' in man ... [T]he fact that such a farrago of nonsense is taken seriously by people of education and intelligence almost makes us despair of human progress" ("Christian Science: What It Is," BMJ 1898, vol. 2, 1515-16).) It was a loss from which he never fully recovered. Laura Allen died on March 25, 1936, at Oxford. Her death notice ended: "Whom have I in heaven but thee: and there is none upon earth that I desire in comparison of thee" (Ps. 73:24, Coverdale trans.). Allen was old-fashioned in tutorials, but was the patron of a dining society, a lover of fine food and wine, and a much-respected and courteous member of college life. He died on 30 April 1950, at his home, 24 St Michael's Street, Oxford. His funeral was held at Queen's College Chapel on May 4, the service being conducted by the Rev. D. E. Nineham.

== Works ==
=== Editions ===
- Goodwin, A., ed. (1893). Hymni Homerici. Oxford: Clarendon Press. (Note: Corrections given in Allen, T. W. (1894). "Hymni Homerici (ed. Goodwin, 1893)." The Academy Vol. 46, No. 1168, p. 218. Allen also clarifies some of his editorial activity: "In Mr. Goodwin's edition ... the absence of a record of conjectures is to be taken to imply disapproval of them" (JHS 15 [1895]: 137).) [Prepared for the press by T. W. Allen from papers left by Goodwin.]
- Monro, D. B., ed. (1896). Homeri opera et reliquiae. Oxford: Clarendon Press. pp. 907–996. [Homeric Hymns amended anew with brief notes by T. W. Allen.]
- Monro, D. B.; Allen, T. W., eds. (1902). Homeri opera. Scriptorum classicorum bibliotheca Oxoniensis. Vol. I. Ilias I–XII. Oxford: Clarendon Press.
  - 2nd ed. Oxford: Clarendon Press, 1908; 3rd ed. Oxford: Clarendon Press, 1920.
- Monro, D. B.; Allen, T. W., eds. (1902). Homeri opera. Scriptorum classicorum bibliotheca Oxoniensis. Vol. II. Ilias XIII–XXIV. Oxford: Clarendon Press.
  - 2nd ed. Oxford: Clarendon Press, 1908; 3rd ed. Oxford: Clarendon Press, 1920.
- Allen, T. W., ed. (1908). Homeri opera. Scriptorum classicorum bibliotheca Oxoniensis. Vol. III. Odyssea I–XII. Oxford: Clarendon Press.
  - 2nd ed. Oxford: Clarendon Press, 1917.
- Allen, T. W., ed. (1908). Homeri opera. Scriptorum classicorum bibliotheca Oxoniensis. Vol. IV. Odyssea XII–XXIV. Oxford: Clarendon Press.
  - 2nd ed. Oxford: Clarendon Press, 1919.
- Allen, T. W., ed. (1912). Homeri opera. Scriptorum classicorum bibliotheca Oxoniensis. Vol. V. Hymni, Epigrammata, Fragmenta. Oxford: Clarendon Press.
  - Reprint with corr. Oxford: Clarendon Press, 1946.
- Allen, T. W.; Sikes, E. E., eds. (1904). The Homeric Hymns. London: Macmillan.
  - Allen, Thomas W.; Sikes, E. E.; Halliday, W. R., eds. (1936). The Homeric Hymns (2nd ed.). Oxford: Clarendon Press.
- Allen, T. W., ed. (1921). The Homeric Catalogue of Ships. Oxford: Clarendon Press. (Note: Corrections and additional evidence given in Allen, T. W. (1924). Homer: The Origins and The Transmission, 328-50. Oxford: Clarendon Press.)

=== Books ===
- .Allen, T. W. (1889). Notes on Abbreviations in Greek Manuscripts. Oxford: Clarendon Press.
- Allen, T. W. (1890). Notes on Greek Manuscripts in Italian Libraries. Oxford: Clarendon Press.
- Allen, T. W. (1898). Plato — Codex Oxoniensis Clarkianus 39 phototypice editus. Codices Graeci et Latini photographice depicti, III. Leiden: A. W. Sijthoff.
- Allen, T. W.; Williams White, J., eds. (1902). ΑΡΙΣΤΟΦΑΝΟΥΣ ΚΩΜΩΙΔΙΑΙ. Facsimile of the Codex Venetus Marcianus 474. London – Boston: The Archaeological Institute of America and The Society for the Promotion of Hellenic Studies.
- Allen, T. W. (1924). Homer: The Origins and the Transmission. Oxford: Clarendon Press.

=== Notes and Articles ===
- Allen, T. W. (1887). "Compendiums in Greek Palaeography". The Academy. 31 (787): 399–400.
- Allen, T. W. (1887). "Lucian Harl. 5694". The Academy. 32 (807): 273.
- Allen, T. W. (1889). "The Venice Athenaeus". The Academy. 35 (895): 451.
- Allen, T. W. (1889). "The Ravenna Aristophanes". The Academy. 36 (899): 59.
- Allen, T. W. (1889). "The Greek MSS. in the Warsaw Town Library". The Academy. 36 (919): 391.
- Allen, T. W. (1889). "Notes on Greek MSS in Italian Libraries". The Classical Review. 3: 12–22. doi:10.1017/S0009840X00193916.
- Allen, T. W. (1889). "Notes on Greek MSS in Italian Libraries (continued)". The Classical Review. 3: 252–256. doi:10.1017/S0009840X00195137.
- Allen, T. W. (1889). "Notes on Greek MSS in Italian Libraries (continued)". The Classical Review. 3: 345–352. doi:10.1017/S0009840X00195654.
- Allen, T. W. (1890). "Notes on Greek MSS in Italian Libraries (continued)". The Classical Review. 4: 103–105. doi:10.1017/S0009840X00189747.
- Allen, T. W. (1890). "MSS of the Iliad in Rome". The Classical Review. 4: 289–293. doi:10.1017/S0009840X00190481.
- Allen, T. W. (1890). "Fourteenth-Century Tachygraphy". The Journal of Hellenic Studies. 11: 286–293. doi:10.2307/623435. JSTOR 623435.
- Allen, T. W. (1891). "Palaeographica: I, II". The Journal of Philology. 19: 62–68.
- Allen, T. W. (1891). "Palaeographica: III. A Group of Ninth-Century Greek MSS". The Journal of Philology. 21: 48–55.
- Allen, T. W. (1894). "On the Composition of Some Greek MSS". The Journal of Philology. 22: 157–183.
- Allen, T. W. (1895). "The Text of the Homeric Hymns". The Journal of Hellenic Studies. 15: 136–183. doi:10.2307/624065. JSTOR 624065.
- Allen, T. W. (1895). "The Text of the Homeric Hymns. Part II". The Journal of Hellenic Studies. 15: 251–313. doi:10.2307/624075. JSTOR 624075.
- Allen, T. W. (1896). "On the Composition of Some Greek MSS: II. The Ravenna Aristophanes". The Journal of Philology. 24: 300–326.
- Allen, T. W. (1896). "Recent Italian Catalogues of Greek MSS". The Classical Review. 10 (5): 234–237. doi:10.1017/S0009840X00204034.
- Allen, T. W. (1897). "Hesiodea". The Classical Review. 11 (8): 396–398. doi:10.1017/S0009840X00042049.
- Allen, T. W. (1897). "Notes on the Homeric Hymns by J. P. D'Orville". The Journal of Philology. 25: 250–260.
- Allen, T. W. (1897). "The Text of the Homeric Hymns. Part III". The Journal of Hellenic Studies. 17: 45–62. doi:10.2307/623817. JSTOR 623817.
- Allen, T. W. (1897). "The Text of the Homeric Hymns. Part IV". The Journal of Hellenic Studies. 17: 241–267. doi:10.2307/623829. JSTOR 623829.
- Allen, T. W. (1898). "The Text of the Homeric Hymns. Part V". The Journal of Hellenic Studies. 18: 23–32. doi:10.2307/623714. JSTOR 623714.
- Allen, T. W. (1899). "On the Composition of Some Greek MSS: III. The Venetian Homer". The Journal of Philology. 26: 161–181.
- Allen, T. W. (1899). "Aristarchus and the Modern Vulgate of Homer". The Classical Review. 13 (9): 429–432. doi:10.1017/S0009840X00079142.
- Allen, T. W. (1899). "The Ancient and Modern Vulgate of Homer". The Classical Review. 13 (7): 334–339. doi:10.1017/S0009840X00078926.
- Allen, T. W. (1899). "The Text of the Iliad". The Classical Review. 13 (2): 110–116. doi:10.1017/S0009840X00042621.
- Allen, T. W. (1900). "New Homeric Papyri". The Classical Review. 14: 14–18. doi:10.1017/S0009840X00080148.
- Allen, T. W. (1900). "The Text of the Iliad—II". The Classical Review. 14 (6): 290–291. doi:10.1017/S0009840X00082901.
- Allen, T. W. (1900). "The Text of the Iliad—III". The Classical Review. 14 (8): 384–388. doi:10.1017/S0009840X0008330X.
- Allen, T. W. (1900). "Zenodotus, Aristophanes, and the Modern Homeric Text". The Classical Review. 14 (5): 242–244. doi:10.1017/S0009840X00082639.
- Allen, T. W. (1901). "The Nature of the Ancient Homeric Vulgate". The Classical Review. 15: 5–9. doi:10.1017/S0009840X00029334.
- Allen, T. W. (1901). "The Eccentric Editions and Aristarchus". The Classical Review. 15 (5): 241–246. doi:10.1017/S0009840X00030316.
- Allen, T. W. (1901). "The Euripidean Catalogue of Ships". The Classical Review. 15 (7): 346–350. doi:10.1017/S0009840X00030936.
- Allen, T. W. (1902). "Characteristics of the Homeric Vulgate". The Classical Review. 16: 1–3. doi:10.1017/S0009840X00205209.
- Allen, T. W. (1902). "Aristophanes, Knights, 532, 3". The Classical Review. 16 (2): 101–102. doi:10.1017/S0009840X00205465.
- Allen, T. W. (1903). "P. Tebtunis 4". The Classical Review. 17: 4–5. doi:10.1017/S0009840X00207117.
- "The Ancient Name of Gla." The Classical Review 17 (1903): 239-40.
- Allen, T. W. (1904). "New Homeric Papyri". The Classical Review. 18 (3): 147–150. doi:10.1017/S0009840X00209529.
- "Adversaria Graeca." The Classical Review 19 (1905): 197-200; 20 (1906): 5-6.
- "Etymologica." The Classical Review 19 (1905): 256-57.
- "Theognis." The Classical Review 19 (1905): 386-95.
- "Μυρμιδόνων Πόλις." The Classical Review 20 (1906): 193-201.
- "Varia Graeca." The Classical Review 20 (1906): 290-91.
- "Varia Graeca." The Classical Quarterly 2 (1908): 216-19; 3 (1909): 285-88.
- "A New Orphic Papyrus." The Classical Review 21 (1907): 97-100.
- "The Homeridae." The Classical Quarterly 1 (1907): 135-43.
- "The Epic Cycle." The Classical Quarterly 2 (1908): 64-74; 2 (1908): 81-88.
- "Argos in Homer." The Classical Quarterly 3 (1909): 81-98.
- "Dictys of Crete and Homer." The Journal of Philology 31 (1910): 207-33.
- "The Text of the Odyssey." Papers of the British School at Rome 5 (1910): 3–85.
- "The Homeric Catalogue." The Journal of Hellenic Studies 30 (1910): 292-322.
- "Homerica. I. The Achaeans." The Classical Review 25 (1911): 233-36.
- "Lives of Homer." The Journal of Hellenic Studies 32 (1912): 250-60; 33 (1913): 19-26.
- "Pisistratus and Homer." The Classical Quarterly 7 (1913): 33-51.
- "The Canonicity of Homer." The Classical Quarterly 7 (1913): 221-33.
- "Homerica II. Additions to the Epic Cycle." The Classical Review 27 (1913): 189-91.
- "Hymns (Greek and Roman)." In Hastings, James, ed. (1914). Encyclopaedia of Religion and Ethics, 7:40-42. Edinburgh: T & T Clark.
- "MSS of Strabo at Paris and Eton." The Classical Quarterly 9 (1915): 15-26; 9 (1915): 86-96.
- "The Date of Hesiod." The Journal of Hellenic Studies 35 (1915): 85-99.
- "The Origin of the Greek Minuscule Hand." The Journal of Hellenic Studies 40 (1920): 1-12.
- "Three Greek Scribes." In Miscellanea Francesco Ehrle IV (Studi e testi 40), 22–33. Roma: 1924.
- "Greek Abbreviation in the Fifteenth Century." Proceedings of the British Academy 12 (1926): 55-65 + 3 plates.
- "Miscellanea." The Classical Quarterly 22 (1928): 73–76, 203–204; 23 (1929): 28–30; 24 (1930): 40–41, 188–190; 25 (1931): 23–26, 146–150; 26 (1932): 82–87; 27 (1933): 51–53, 200–2.
- "The Homeric Scholia." Proceedings of the British Academy 17 (1931): 179–207.
- "Theognis." Proceedings of the British Academy 20 (1934): 71–89.
- "Adversaria." Revue de Philologie 60 (1934): 237–42; 62 (1936): 201–8; 63 (1937): 280–86; 65 (1939): 44–46; 72 (1946): 124-27
- "Theognis." Revue de Philologie 66 (1940): 211–14.
- "Theognis, ed. Diehl 1933." Revue de Philologie 72 (1946): 128–30.
- "Theognis, ed. Diehl 1936." Revue de Philologie 76 (1950): 135–45.

=== Reviews ===
- Review of Batiffol, L'Abbaye de Rossano. The Classical Review 6 (1892): 454-57.
- Review of Gehring, Index Homericus. The Classical Review 9 (1895): 415-18.
- Review of Puntoni, L'Inno Omerico a Demetra. The Classical Review 10 (1896): 392-93.
- Review of Ludwich, Die homerische Batrachomachia. The Classical Review 11 (1897): 165-67.
- Review of Zereteli, De Compendiis script. cod. graec. praecipue Petropolitanorum et Mosquensium. The Classical Review 12 (1898): 57.
- Review of Ludwich, Die Homervulgata. The Classical Review 13 (1899): 39-41.
- Review of Leaf, The Iliad. The Classical Review 14 (1900): 360-62.
- Review of Grenfell and Hunt, Amherst Papyri, II. The Classical Review 15 (1901): 425-26.
- Review of Ludwich, Homeri Carmina. Pars prior. Ilias. The Classical Review 17 (1903): 58; 23 (1909): 17
- Review of Rzach, Hesiodi Carmina. The Classical Review 17 (1903): 261-62
- Review of Gardthausen, Sammlungen und Cataloge griech. Handschriften. The Classical Review 18 (1904): 177-78.
- Review of Hennings, Homers Odyssee. The Classical Review 19 (1905): 359.
- Review of Blass, Die Interpolationen in der Odyssee. The Classical Review 20 (1906): 267-71.
- Review of Champault, Phéniciens et Grecs en Italie d'après l'Odyssée. The Classical Review 20 (1906): 470.
- Review of Lang, Homer and his Age. The Classical Review 21 (1907): 16-19.
- Review of Martini and Bassi, Catalogus cod. graec. Bibl. Ambrosianae. The Classical Review 21 (1907): 83-85.
- Review of Agar, Homerica. The Classical Quarterly 3 (1909): 223-29; 4 (1910); 206-8.
- Review of Fick, Die Enstehung der Odyssee. The Classical Review 25 (1911): 20-22.
- Review of Mülder, Die Ilias und ihre Quellen. The Classical Review 25 (1911): 114-15.
- Review of Gerhard, Veröffentlichungen aus der Heidelberger Papyrus-Sammlung. IV. I. The Classical Review 25 (1911): 253-55.
- "Greek Palaeography and Textual Criticism." In Whibley, Leonard, ed. (1912). The Year's Work in Classical Studies, 1911, 127-32. London: John Murray.
- "Greek Palaeography and Textual Criticism." In Whibley, Leonard, ed. (1913). The Year's Work in Classical Studies, 1912, 115-22. London: John Murray.
- "Greek Palaeography and Textual Criticism." In Bailey, Cyril, ed. (1914). The Year's Work in Classical Studies, 1913, 85-92. London: John Murray.
- Review of Leaf, Troy. A Study in Homeric Geography. The Journal of Hellenic Studies 33 (1913): 114-15.
- Review of Belzner, Homerische Probleme. II. Die Komposition der Odyssee. The Journal of Hellenic Studies 33 (1913): 116.
- Review of Drerup, Das Fünfte Buch der Ilias. The Journal of Hellenic Studies 33 (1913): 380.
- Review of Roemer, Aristarchs Athetesen in der Homerkritik. The Classical Review 28 (1914): 141-42.
- Review of Smyth, The Composition of the Iliad. The Classical Review 28 (1914): 230-31.
- Review of Bethe, Homer, Dichtung und Sage. I. Ilias. The Journal of Hellenic Studies 34 (1914): 334.
- Review of Thomson, Studies in the Odyssey. The Journal of Hellenic Studies 34 (1914): 335.
- "Greek Palaeography and Textual Criticism." In Bailey, Cyril, ed. (1915). The Year's Work in Classical Studies, 1914, 45-50. London: John Murray.
- Review of Boudreaux, Le Texte d'Aristophane et ses Commentateurs. The Journal of Hellenic Studies 40 (1920): 231-32.
- "Greek Palaeography." In Gaselee, Stephen, ed. (1918). The Year's Work in Classical Studies, 1917, 111-14. London: John Murray.
- Review of Cauer, Grundfragen der Homerkritik. The Journal of Hellenic Studies 41 (1921): 298.
- Review of Drerup, ed., Homerische Poetik, I. and III. The Journal of Hellenic Studies 41 (1921): 298-99.
- "Greek Palaeography and Textual Criticism." In Robertson, D. S., ed. (1923). The Year's Work in Classical Studies, 1922-1923, 65–68. Bristol: J. W. Arrowsmith.
- "Greek Palaeography and Textual Criticism." In Owen, S. G., ed. (1927). The Year's Work in Classical Studies, 1926-1927, 69–74. Bristol: J. W. Arrowsmith.
- Review of Hurlbut, Selected Latin Vocabularies for Second-Year Reading. Classical Weekly 21 (1927): 111–12.
- "Greek Palaeography." In Owen, S. G., ed. (1934). The Year's Work in Classical Studies, 1934, 69–74. Bristol: J. W. Arrowsmith.
- Review of Lake and Lake, Dated Greek Minuscule Manuscripts to the Year 1200, I-IV The Journal of Hellenic Studies 56 (1936): 115–17.
- Review of Spranger, Euripidis quae in codice Veneto Marciano 471. The Journal of Hellenic Studies 57 (1937): 109.
- Review of Lake and Lake, Dated Greek Minuscule Manuscripts to the Year 1200, V. The Journal of Hellenic Studies 57 (1937): 109.
- Review of Powell, A List of Printed Catalogues of Greek MSS in Italy. The Classical Review 51 (1937): 36–37.
- Review of Spranger, Euripidis quae in codice Hierosolymitano rescripto Patriarchalis bibliothecae. The Journal of Hellenic Studies 58 (1938): 120.
- Review of Drerup, Der homerische Apollonhymnos. The Journal of Hellenic Studies 58 (1938): 121, 293.
- Review of Lake and Lake, Dated Greek Minuscule Manuscripts to the Year 1200, VII-IX. The Journal of Hellenic Studies 59 (1939): 178–79.

== Likenesses ==
- Thomas William Allen, by Walter Stoneman (bromide print, June 1939). Photographs Collection, National Portrait Gallery, London (ref. no. NPG x163567).
- Thomas William Allen (1862–1950), Fellow (1890), Librarian, by Edward Irvine Halliday (oil on canvas, 1930). The Queen's College, Oxford.
