= List of honorary fellows of the British Academy =

The Fellowship of the British Academy consists of world-leading scholars and researchers in the humanities and social sciences. A varying number of fellows are elected each year in July at the Academy's annual general meeting. Honorary fellows are "expected to have 'contributed signally to the promotion of the purposes for which the Academy was founded', either as persons of academic distinction in other fields whose work has a bearing on the humanities or social sciences; or as leading figures or philanthropists who have themselves done distinguished work in the Academy's fields of interest or promoted or advanced the causes for which the Academy was founded." Up to four may be elected each year.

== List ==
Names, titles and additional information are formatted as they appear in the cited source(s).

Year elected	Name and additional information
1916	Earl of Cromer
1916	Sir Samuel Walker Griffith
1921	Bishop G. Forrest Browne
1922	Dr Charles Montagu Doughty
1922	Lord Phillimore
1923	Dr Francis Herbert Bradley
1929	Rev. Professor A. H. Sayce
1938	Charles Wakefield, 1st Viscount Wakefield
1949	Bertrand Russell
1950	Sir Frederic Kenyon
1952	Sir Winston Churchill
1953	Gustaf VI Adolf, King of Sweden
1954	Senator Luigi Einaudi, President of the Italian Republic
1962	Sir Sarvepalli Radhakrishnan, President of the Republic of India
1976	Dr Walter Pagel
1978	Dr Marc Fitch
1978	Dr Constantine Trypanis
1979	Tom Denning, Baron Denning
1980	Dr M. Aylwin Cotton
1980	Sir William Deakin
1980	Sir Geoffrey Keynes
1981	Harold Macmillan
1981	Sir Peter Medawar
1982	A. W. Lawrence
1982	W. P. Thesiger
1983	John Cameron, Lord Cameron
1983	Michael Ramsey
1984	Professor Edward Thomas Hall
1984	Professor David Beers Quinn
1985	Professor Kristof Glamann
1986	Dr Hugh Edward Richardson
1986	Leonard Wolfson, Baron Wolfson
1986	Professor John Zachary Young
1987	Dr Donald Harden
1987	Professor Otto Skutsch
1988	John Sinclair Morrison
1988	Obert C. Tanner
1990	Sir Rex Richards
1993	Roy Jenkins
1994	Paul Mellon
1995	Michael Young, Baron Young of Dartington
1997	Sir David Cox
1997	Sir Kenneth Durham
1998	Lee Seng Tee
1998	Jacob Rothschild, 4th Baron Rothschild
2000	Dr Neil MacGregor
2000	Mary Warnock, Baroness Warnock
2000	Harry Woolf, Baron Woolf
2002	Professor Robert Hinde
2002	Professor David William Rhind
2002	Sir Michael Rutte
2003	Tom Bingham, Baron Bingham of Cornhill
2004	Sir Nicholas Goodison
2004	Brenda Hale, Baroness Hale of Richmond
2005	David Hennessy, 3rd Baron Windlesham
2006	Dr David Packard
2006	Dr Lisbet Rausing
2008	Professor Sir Michael Marmot, Director, International Institute for Society and Health; MRC Research Professor of Epidemiology and Public Health, University College London
2010	Melvyn Bragg, Chancellor, University of Leeds; independent writer and broadcaster
2011	Sir Tim Berners-Lee, Director, World Wide Web Consortium; 3Com Founders Professor, MIT Computer Science and Artificial Intelligence Laboratory
2011	Professor Sir Richard Brook, Emeritus Professor, Department of Materials, University of Oxford; formerly Director of the Leverhulme Trust
2012	Martin Reesw, Master, Trinity College, Cambridge; former President, Royal Society
2012	Dame Fiona Reynolds, Master, Emmanuel College, Cambridge; former Chief Executive, The National Trust
2013	Helena Kennedy, Baroness Kennedy of The Shaws, barrister and human rights campaigner
2013	Robert B. Silvers
2014	Dame Liz Forgan
2014	Gus O'Donnell
2015	Dame Lynne Brindley Master of Pembroke College, Oxford
2015	Dame Carol Ann Duffy, Professor of Contemporary Poetry and Creative Director of the Manchester Writing School, Manchester Metropolitan University; Poet Laureate
2015	Sir John Eliot Gardiner, founder and artistic director of the Monteverdi Choir, the English Baroque Soloists and the Orchestre Révolutionnaire et Romantique
2016	Sir Paul Nurse
2016	Justice Kate O'Regan
2016	David Sainsbury, Baron Sainsbury of Turville
2016	Janet L. Yellen
2017	Dame Dame Antonia Byatt, novelist
2017	Graça Machel, Chancellor of the University of Cape Town; President of the School of Oriental and African Studies (SOAS), University of London; founder and chair, the Graça Machel Trust
2017	George Soros, Chairman, Soros Fund Management; founder and Chairman, Open Society Foundations
2017	Sir Tom Stoppard, playwright and screenwriter; Cameron Mackintosh Visiting Professor of Contemporary Theatre, St Catherine's College, Oxford
