= Joel Hurstfield =

British historian (1911–1980)

Professor Joel Hurstfield
- Born: 4 November 1911
- Died: 29 November 1980 (aged 69)
- Occupations: Historian and academic
- Title: Astor Professor of English History
- Spouse: Elizabeth Walters
- Children: 2

Academic background
- Education: Dame Alice Owen's School
- Alma mater: University College London

Academic work
- Discipline: History
- Sub-discipline: Early modern Britain; Elizabethan era; Political history; Reformation
- Institutions: University of Southampton; Queen Mary University of London; University College London; Huntington Library

Joel M. Hurstfield (4 November 1911 – 29 November 1980) was a British historian of the Tudor period. He held the Astor Chair in English History at University College London from 1962 to 1979.

== Early life and career ==
He was educated at Dame Alice Owen's School in Islington and University College London, where he obtained a first class honours degree. He also won the Pollard and Gladstone Prizes and studied under J. E. Neale. Hurstfield was lecturer at University College, Southampton from 1937 until 1940. He planned to stand for Parliament but his adoption as a parliamentary candidate was prevented by the outbreak of the Second World War. Hurstfield worked for the civil service during the war and contributed to a volume of the official history of the war, The Control of Raw Materials (1953).

In 1946 he was appointed a lecturer at Queen Mary University of London and held a joint seminar on Tudor history with J. E. Neale at the Institute of Historical Research. In 1962 he succeeded M. A. Thomson as the Astor Professor of English History at University College London, which he held until 1979. Hurstfield was also Public Orator at London University from 1967 until 1971. In 1979 he became a senior research associate at the Huntington Library in San Marino, California.

== Personal life ==
Hurstfield married Elizabeth Valmai Walters and they had one son and one daughter.

== Works ==
- The Queen's Wards: Wardship and Marriage under Elizabeth I (London: Longmans, Green & Co., 1958).
- Elizabeth I and the Unity of England (London: The English Universities Press, 1960).
- The Elizabethan Nation (London: BBC, 1964).
- The Reformation Crisis (London: Edward Arnold, 1965).
- Freedom, Corruption and Government in Elizabethan England (London: Jonathan Cape, 1970).
- The Historical Association Book of the Tudors (London: Sidgwick and Jackson, 1973).
- The Historian As Moralist: Reflections on the Study of Tudor England (London: Athlone Press, 1975).
- The Illusion of Power in Tudor Politics (London: The Athlone Press, 1979).
- Man as a Prisoner of His Past: The Elizabethan Experience (University of Wales Press, 1980).
