= David Michael Slater =

American author and educator

David Michael Slater (born May 8, 1970) is an American author and former educator who has written picture books, young-adult fiction, adult fiction, and nonfiction. Born in Pittsburgh, Pennsylvania, his works include The Book of Nonsense, The Boy & the Book, We're Doing It Wrong, and The Vanishing.

== Early life and education ==
Slater grew up in the Squirrel Hill neighborhood of Pittsburgh, across from the Tree of Life synagogue. Following the 2018 Pittsburgh synagogue shooting, he wrote a first-person essay for the Associated Press about his connection to the neighborhood and the attack.

Slater earned a bachelor's degree from the University of Michigan in 1992, a master's degree from Carnegie Mellon University in 1994, and a Master of Arts in Teaching from Lewis & Clark College in 1995.

== Career ==
Slater worked as a middle-school teacher in Beaverton, Oregon, while beginning his writing career. In 2012, he was named Educator of the Year by the City of Beaverton. In a 2009 review, Portland Monthly described The Book of Nonsense as his first young-adult novel and praised his handling of its flawed protagonists. The novel, which draws on the fiction of Jorge Luis Borges, was also reviewed in the academic journal Variaciones Borges. Reviewer Mark Frisch discussed its references to "The Library of Babel" and other Borges stories, as well as its treatment of sibling rivalry and family relationships.

Slater later wrote the wordless picture books The Bored Book and The Boy & the Book. Publishers Weekly reviewed both works, describing the latter as a story whose apparent lesson about handling books develops into one about compassion. Kirkus Reviews called The Boy & the Book a well-made depiction of a child's first experience of reading.

Bigfoot, the first book in Slater's Mysterious Monsters series, received a bronze medal for juvenile fiction in the 2018 Independent Publisher Book Awards.

His education book We're Doing It Wrong: 25 Ideas in Education That Just Don't Work—And How to Fix Them was the subject of a 2018 author event carried by C-SPAN.

Slater's young-adult novel The Vanishing combines Holocaust historical fiction with magical realism. Kirkus Reviews selected it for its December 2022 list of best independently published books and later included it in a feature on books about Jewish experience.

The Vanishing was also a winner in the 2022 American Fiction Awards.

In 2023, The Vanishing was optioned for film by 26th Street Pictures, the production company founded by Chris Columbus, Michael Barnathan, and Mark Radcliffe.

== Selected works ==
=== Fiction ===
- Cheese Louise! (1999)
- The Book of Nonsense (2008)
- The Bored Book (2009)
- Fun & Games (2013)
- The Boy & the Book (2015)
- Bigfoot (2017)
- Sparks (2021)
- The Vanishing (2022)
- Ugly

=== Nonfiction ===
- We're Doing It Wrong: 25 Ideas in Education That Just Don't Work—And How to Fix Them (2018)
- Wingnuts: A Field Guide to Everyday Extremism in America
