= David A. Slater =

English classicist (1866–1938)

David Ansell Slater, FBA (1866–1938) was an English classicist, academic and schoolmaster. He was Professor of Latin successively at University College, Cardiff (1903–14); Bedford College, London (1914–20); and the University of Liverpool (1920–32). His 1927 apparatus criticus to Ovid's Metamorphoses was considered authoritative.

== Early life and education ==
David Ansell Slater was born on 7 October 1866 at Worcester, the only son of David Slater. After schooling at Bromsgrove, he went up to Magdalen College, Oxford, with a demyship in 1884, and matriculated at the University of Oxford the following year. He graduated with a Bachelor of Arts degree in 1889.

== Schoolmaster ==
In 1890, Slater was appointed an assistant master at Bath College, where he spent seven years teaching the sixth form under the headmastership of T. W. Dunn. According to his obituary in The Times, Slater "had just those gifts of stirring a boy's enthusiasm for Homer or Virgil, which were ideally complementary to the severer discipline of the Porson and Shilleto tradition so notably represented and maintained by Dunn". His "great power of personal sympathy" also made him a successful teacher. A keen walker, he tended to teach morning readings of classical texts, followed by walks with students (and other times alone) to Lynmouth, across Badgworthy Valley in Exmoor, and around Dunkery Hill.

After Dunn left Bath College in 1897, Slater moved to teach in Canterbury and, after two years there, at Stonyhurst College in Lancashire. While there, he published Tentamina, or Essays in Translation into Latin and Greek Verse in 1900.

== Academia ==
Slater left Stonyhurst in 1901 to take up a lectureship in Latin at the University of Glasgow. Two years later, he was appointed Professor of Latin at University College, Cardiff, before moving in 1914 to take up the chair of Latin at Bedford College, London. He published a translation of the Silvae by the Roman poet Statius in 1908 and Aeneas, and Other Verses and Versions, which was published by Oxford University Press in 1910. He left Bedford College in 1920 to be Professor of Latin at the University of Liverpool, succeeding the eminent classicist John Percival Postgate to that well-paid chair.

At Liverpool, Slater published Sortes Vergilianæ in 1922, but it was a book published five years later that would be his most important work: Towards a Text of the Metamorphosis of Ovid comprised an extensive apparatus criticus to the text based on three manuscripts; until 2004, this remained the "fully authoritative" critical apparatus to the text and it "established [Slater's] reputation". In the Blackwell Companion to Ovid, Peter E. Knox described Slater's book as a "monument of Ovidian scholarship"; and he remarks that Slater's edition of the Narrationes which he included in Towards a Text was one of two "useable" editions. In 1929, he was elected a Fellow of the British Academy, the United Kingdom's national academy for the humanities and social sciences. He retired from Liverpool in 1932, being appointed to an emeritus professorship. He began work on an edition of the Metamorphoses itself for the Oxford Classical Texts series, but did not complete it (and an edition, by R. J. Tarrant, would only be finally published in the series in 2004).

== Later life and death ==
In retirement, Slater continued to live in the Wirral, at Hoylake. He died at the age of 72 on 27 October 1938. He was buried at Thurstaston, a village at the end of a five-mile trek from Hoylake that he enjoyed in his later years.
