= Fellow of the British Academy =

Award granted by the British Academy

- The British Academy's premises at 10–11 Carlton House Terrace
- Sponsored by: British Academy
- Location: London
- Country: United Kingdom
- Presented by: British Academy
- No. of fellows: more than 1,700 (as of 2025)
- Website: thebritishacademy.ac.uk

Fellowship of the British Academy (post-nominal letters FBA) is an award granted by the British Academy to leading academics for their distinction in the humanities and social sciences. The categories people are elected to are:

1. Fellows – scholars resident in the United Kingdom
2. Corresponding Fellows – scholars resident overseas
3. Honorary Fellows – an honorary academic title (whereby the post-nominal letters "HonFBA" are used)

The award of fellowship is based on published work and fellows may use the post-nominal letters FBA. Examples of Fellows are Edward Rand; Mary Beard; Roy Porter; Nicholas Stern, Baron Stern of Brentford; Michael Lobban; M. R. James; Friedrich Hayek; John Maynard Keynes; Lionel Robbins; Rowan Williams; and Margaret Boden.

The highest number of female academics (up until 2022) were elected and recognised for their work in 2022. As of 2025, the fellowship consists of over 1,800 scholars worldwide. 88 people were elected to be fellows in 2025, with a further 4 people elected as honorary fellows.

== See also ==
- List of fellows of the British Academy
