= Talbot Rice =

Talbot Rice may refer to:

== Places ==
- Talbot Rice Gallery, art gallery of the University of Edinburgh

== People ==
- Alexander Talbot-Rice (born 1969), British portrait artist
- David Talbot Rice (1903–1972), English art historian
- Tamara Talbot Rice (1904–1993), Russian-English art historian
