= Martin Robertson =

British classicist and poet (1911–2004)

- Born: Charles Martin Robertson; 11 September 1911; Pangbourne, United Kingdom
- Died: 26 December 2004 (aged 93); Cambridge, United Kingdom
- Resting place: Cambridge City Cemetery
- Spouse: Theodosia Spring Rice (m. 1942; died 1984) Louise Berge Holstein (m. 1988)
- Children: 6, including Stephen Robertson and Thomas Dolby
- Parents: Donald Struan Robertson (father); Petica Coursolles Robertson (mother)
- Relatives: Agnes Arber (aunt); Margaret Hills (aunt); Giles Henry Robertson (brother)

Academic background
- Education: The Leys School, Cambridge; Trinity College, Cambridge

Academic work
- Discipline: Classics
- Sub-discipline: Ancient Greek art
- Institutions: British Museum; University College London; University of Oxford
- Notable students: Lisa French
- Notable works: A History of Greek Art (1975)
- Military service
- Allegiance: United Kingdom
- Branch: British Army
- Service years: 1940–1946
- Units: Royal Signals; Intelligence Corps

Charles Martin Robertson (11 September 1911 – 26 December 2004) was a British classical scholar and poet. He specialised in the art and archaeology of Ancient Greece, and was best known for his 1975 publication, A History of Greek Art.

Born in Pangbourne, Robertson was the son of a classicist and the brother of a noted art historian. He was educated at The Leys School and Trinity College, Cambridge, and took part in archaeological excavations from 1930. After a period at the British School at Athens (BSA), he joined the British Museum in 1936, where he became an apprentice of the art historian Bernard Ashmole. During the Second World War, Robertson served briefly in the Royal Signals before being transferred to intelligence work, in which capacity he was a subordinate of the archaeologist Alan Wace and a colleague of the Soviet agent Kim Philby, who had been his contemporary at Cambridge.

Robertson succeeded Ashmole as Yates Professor of Classical Art and Archaeology at University College London in 1948. He returned to the BSA in 1957–1958, and became chair of its governing council in 1959. In 1961, once again following Ashmole, he was appointed Lincoln Professor of Classical Archaeology and Art at the University of Oxford, where he remained until his retirement in 1978. Alongside his archaeological work, Robertson wrote and published poetry, releasing four collections of his works in the 1970s.

Robertson's archaeological publications included material from Ithaca and Perachora in Greece and from the site of Al-Mina in Syria. His work on Greek art extended that of John Beazley, who had pioneered the study of Attic vase-painting in the first half of the twentieth century. His History of Greek Art remained a standard reference for many decades, and in 1983 the museum curator Ian Jenkins wrote that "there can be few students of Greek art who would not readily admit their debt to him".

== Early life ==
Charles Martin Robertson was born in Pangbourne, Berkshire, on 11 September 1911. He was the eldest child of Donald Struan Robertson and Petica Coursolles, née Jones. His mother maintained a literary salon; his father was a classicist, who had been appointed as an assistant lecturer at the University of Cambridge in the year of Robertson's birth and became the university's Regius Professor of Greek in 1930. Robertson was known as "Martin" throughout his life.

Robertson attended The Leys School and Trinity College, Cambridge, where he read classics. His university contemporaries included the art historian Dale Trendall and the politician Enoch Powell, as well as Kim Philby, later a spy for the Soviet Union within the British Secret Intelligence Service, who became Robertson's friend. (Note: For Philby's intelligence activities, see Dujmovik, Nicholas (2010). "Getting Intelligence History Right: Reflections and Recommendations from the Inside". In Johnson, Loch K. (ed.). The Oxford Handbook of National Security Intelligence. Oxford University Press. p. 81. ISBN 978-0-19-988847-4.) Robertson visited the British School at Athens (BSA) and attended his first excavations in 1930, in the summer before his matriculation at Trinity, at Perachora in the Corinthia, under the directorship of the archaeologist Humfry Payne, the BSA's director. He graduated from Trinity in 1934 with a First in part two of tripos, having achieved relatively poor results in his first year and a Second in his second. Later, in 1934–1936, Robertson moved to Athens as a student of the BSA, still under Payne's directorship. His colleagues at the BSA included Romilly Jenkins, Nicholas Hammond, Robert Cook, Peter Megaw and Thomas Dunbabin. While in Athens, he worked on Iron Age material from the excavation of Ithaca. He published a short article in The Journal of Hellenic Studies in 1935, on a skyphos painted by the fifth-century BCE Pan Painter: his father had introduced him to the vase, and both Robertsons had independently identified it as the painter's handiwork.

== Academic career ==
Robertson unsuccessfully applied to be made a fellow of Trinity in 1936: he was required to submit written work in support of his application, and did so on the material from Ithaca, but his examiner mistakenly sent Robertson's file to the Oxford art historian John Beazley, who was supporting Dale Trendall's competing application. Robertson instead took a post in September 1936 as Assistant Keeper in the Greek and Roman department of the British Museum, cataloguing the pottery from the excavations at Al-Mina in Syria led by Leonard Woolley in 1936–1937. In 1937–1938, staff in the department carried out an aggressive cleaning of the Elgin Marbles, using copper tools and abrasive silicon carbide, at the request of the entrepreneur Joseph Duveen; Duveen wanted the sculptures, originally painted, to look whiter for their display in a new gallery which he was funding. Three members of staff left the museum's employment as a result; (Note: The foreman of masons, Arthur Holcombe, had his contract terminated; the department's keeper, Frederick Pryce, was persuaded to resign on grounds of ill-health, and Pryce's deputy, Roger Hinks, was initially demoted and later resigned.) Robertson was not involved, and so kept his job (leaving him as the only member of the department). He was, however, demoted in seniority. As a consequence of the departures, Denys Haynes was recruited as an Assistant Keeper, and the art historian Bernard Ashmole, the Yates Professor of Classical Art and Archaeology at University College London, was brought in on a part-time basis to run the Department of Greek and Roman Antiquities. Haynes and Robertson became lifelong friends, and Robertson later wrote of the "precious apprenticeship" he gained from working with Ashmole.

Robertson attended a classical conference in Berlin in August 1939, on behalf of the British Museum; he was recalled shortly before the outbreak of the Second World War. From 23 August, he took part in the removal of material from the museum to London Underground stations and country houses, so as to protect the artefacts from bombing. In 1940, he enlisted in the British Army as a member of the Royal Signals, but was soon transferred to the Intelligence Corps and trained to work in cryptanalysis at Bletchley Park. Sparkes later wrote that his military service was largely unsuccessful and characterised by "mind-numbing boredom". In late 1942, shortly after the end of the Second Battle of El Alamein in November, he was moved to the Secret Intelligence Service and sent to Cairo to work with Alan Wace, a fellow archaeologist and former director of the BSA, who had requested Robertson's assistance in carrying out intelligence work in the British embassy there. Due to an administrative mistake, Robertson was transferred to Naples rather than to Athens in 1943–1944, and later served in Salonica in Greece alongside Philby.

Robertson left military service in 1946, and returned to the British Museum, where he assisted in returning the evacuated collections to the galleries. He resigned in 1948 to succeed Ashmole as Yates Professor at UCL. During his tenure in London, he began to grow a beard, but was ordered to stop by his superiors: his obituarist Brian Sparkes wrote that they were concerned that he was displaying "arty" inclinations considered unbecoming of a professor. He was a visiting fellow of the BSA for the 1957–1958 academic year. He published his first book, Greek Painting, in 1959. It used the surviving Greek paintings on vases and other artistic works to reconstruct now-lost frescoes described by ancient authors. Between 1959 and 1968, he was chair of the governing council of the BSA.

In 1961, Robertson again succeeded Ashmole, this time as Lincoln Professor of Classical Archaeology and Art at the University of Oxford, in which role he served until his retirement in 1978. He edited the second volume of the BSA's excavations at Perachora in 1962, following the deaths of Payne (who had conducted the excavations) and of the editors initially appointed to publish the work. In 1968–1969, he was a visiting scholar at the Institute for Advanced Study in Princeton, New Jersey; he also held a visiting appointment at the J. Paul Getty Museum in Los Angeles in 1980. In 1992, he published The Art of Vase-Painting in Classical Athens, continuing and concluding his scholarly interest in Athenian painting.

From 1994, Robertson suffered from Guillain–Barré syndrome and myasthenia gravis. He died of cardiovascular disease and bronchopneumonia at home in Cambridge on 26 December 2004, and was buried in Cambridge City Cemetery.

== Influence on classical scholarship ==
As a scholar, Robertson is best remembered for his work on Greek art, in particular vase painting. He improved the techniques developed by Beazley to attribute unsigned works to specific vase-painters. When Beazley died in 1970, Robertson and another of Beazley's students, Dietrich von Bothmer, updated and enlarged Beazley's earlier lists of painters, Paralipomena: Additions to Attic Black-Figure Vase-Painters and to Attic Red-Figure Vase-Painters; they published their edition in 1971. Among Robertson's students at UCL was the Mycenaean archaeologist Lisa French, who completed her doctorate in 1961.John Boardman, who wrote Robertson's entry in the Oxford Dictionary of National Biography, described him as a "careful, not enthusiastic lecturer, with a minor voice impediment", and as a diligent supervisor of graduate students, albeit one sometimes excessively slow to criticise their work.

Robertson's History of Greek Art, which first appeared in 1975, was still considered authoritative in the twenty-first century. Also in 1975, he published The Parthenon Frieze in collaboration with the photographer Alison Frantz. In 1982, he was the dedicatee of a Festschrift, The Eye of Greece, edited by Donna Kurtz and Brian Sparkes. Robertson's work on Athenian red-figure vase-painting culminated in The Art of Vase-Painting in Classical Athens, published in 1992 while he was in his eighties. The museum curator Ian Jenkins wrote in 1983 that "there can be few students of Greek art who would not readily admit their debt to him".

== Poetry ==
...But I'd talked enough. I laid the girl
down among the flowers. A soft cloak spread,
my arm around her neck, I comforted
her fear. The fawn soon ceased to flee.
Over her breasts my hand moved gently,
the new-formed girlhood she bared for me;
over all her body, the nude skin bare,
I spilt my white force, just touching her yellow hair.

— From Archilochus, PColon 7511 (trans. Robertson)

As a poet Robertson published various collections, including Crooked Connections (1970), For Rachel (1972), A Hot Bath at Bedtime (1975), and The Sleeping Beauty's Prince (1977). Boardman described his poetry as "personal, often witty and sensitive, [and] much admired by many". He also published translations of Greek poetry, including one of a fragment of an erotic work by Archilochus discovered in 1974.

== Family ==
Robertson's mother was killed in 1941 while serving as an air-raid warden in Cambridge. His paternal aunt, Agnes Arber, was a botanist: she was the third woman and the first female life scientist to be granted membership of the Royal Society. (Note: Packer, Kathryn (23 September 2004). "Arber [née Robertson], Agnes". Oxford Dictionary of National Biography (online ed.). Oxford University Press. doi:10.1093/ref:odnb/30427. (Subscription, Wikipedia Library access or UK public library membership required.)) Another paternal aunt was Margaret Hills, a suffragist organiser and the first woman to sit on Stroud Urban District Council. His brother, Giles Henry Robertson, was a professor of art history at the University of Edinburgh.

Robertson married Theodosia (known as Cecil; née Spring Rice) on 4 September 1942: the couple had six children, including the computer scientist Stephen and the musician Thomas Dolby. Their first child, Lucy, was born while Robertson was posted to Cairo, and raised by Cecil in Iken in Suffolk. While in Suffolk, the Robertsons became friends with the composer Benjamin Britten and his partner, the singer Peter Pears. Cecil died in an accident in 1984. Robertson remarried in 1988, to Louise Berge (née Holstein), who had been his graduate student at Oxford in the late 1960s. She was diagnosed with tongue cancer shortly after Robertson's death, and died in February 2022.

== Selected academic publications ==
=== As sole author ===
- Robertson, Charles Martin (1935). "A Skyphos by the Pan Painter". The Journal of Hellenic Studies. 55: 67–70. doi:10.2307/626660. ISSN 0075-4269. JSTOR 626660.
- — (1949). Why Study Greek Art? An Inaugural Lecture Delivered at University College, London. London: H. K. Lewis & Co. Ltd. OCLC 22090898.
- — (1950). "Origins of the Berlin Painter". The Journal of Hellenic Studies. 70: 23–34. doi:10.2307/629289. ISSN 0075-4269. JSTOR 629289.
- — (1958). "The Gorgos Cup". American Journal of Archaeology. 70 (1): 55–66. doi:10.2307/500461. ISSN 0002-9114. JSTOR 500461.
- — (1959). Greek Painting. Great Centuries of Painting. Geneva: Skira. OCLC 487616.
- — (1963). Between Archaeology and Art History. Oxford: Clarendon Press. OCLC 5288681.
- — (1987). "The State of Attic Vase-Painting in the Mid-Sixth Century". Papers on the Amasis Painter and His World. Malibu: J. Paul Getty Museum. pp. 13–28. ISBN 0-89236-093-3.
- — (1987). Greek, Etruscan, and Roman Vases in the Lady Lever Art Gallery, Port Sunlight. Liverpool: Liverpool University Press. ISBN 978-0-85323-495-1.
- — (1992). The Art of Vase-Painting in Classical Athens. Cambridge: Cambridge University Press. ISBN 978-0-521-33881-3.

=== As co-author ===
- Heurtley, Walter Abel; Robertson, Charles Martin (1948). "Excavations in Ithaca, V: The Geometric and Later Finds from Aetos". Annual of the British School at Athens. 43: 1–124. doi:10.1017/S0068245400005633. ISSN 0068-2454.
- Robertson, Charles Martin; Frantz, Alison (1975). The Parthenon Frieze. New York: Oxford University Press. ISBN 0-7148-1620-5.
- Boardman, John; Robertson, Charles Martin (1979). Corpus Vasorum Antiquorum: Great Britain: Castle Ashby, Northampton. Vol. 15. Oxford: Oxford University Press. ISBN 0-19-725981-2.
- Robertson, Martin; Beard, Mary (1991). "Adopting an Approach". In Rasmussen, Tom; Spivey, Nigel (eds.). Looking at Greek Vases. Cambridge: Cambridge University Press. pp. 1–36. ISBN 0-521-37524-X.
