= Robert Creighton =

Robert Creighton may refer to:

- Robert Creighton (1593–1672), Scottish churchman
- Robert Creighton (1639?–1734), English churchman and composer, son of the above
- Robert James Creighton (1835–1893), New Zealand politician
- Robert Creighton Buck (1920–1998), American mathematician

== See also ==
- Robert Crichton (disambiguation)
