= Gladstone Professor of Greek =

The Gladstone Chair of Greek is an academic position that was one of the original endowments of the foundation of the University of Liverpool in 1881. The Chair was named in recognition of the scholarship of W. E. Gladstone, the British prime minister, and the close association of the Gladstone family with Liverpool.

The chair fell vacant after Professor Long left in 1983 to take up a position in the United States, but was revived in 2017.

== Gladstone Professors of Greek ==
- 1891–1898: Gerald Henry Rendall
- 1898–1906: Gilbert Austin Davies
- 1907–1910: Sir John Lynton Myres
- 1911–1914: Carl Friedrich Ferdinand Lehmann-Haupt
- 1919–1921: Alfred Chilton Pearson (subsequently Regius Professor of Greek at Cambridge University)
- 1922–1950: Archibald Young Campbell
- 1950–1972: Arthur Hilary Armstrong
- 1973–1983: Anthony Arthur Long
- 1983–2017: Chair vacant
- 2017–present: Christopher Tuplin
