= Gerard Baldwin Brown =

British art historian

- Born: October 31, 1849; London, England
- Died: July 12, 1932 (aged 82); Edinburgh, Scotland
- Education: Uppingham School; Oriel College, Oxford
- Alma mater: University of Oxford
- Occupation: Art historian
- Employer: University of Edinburgh
- Known for: The Arts in Early England; historic preservation advocacy
- Title: Watson Gordon Chair of Fine Art
- Spouse: Maude Annie Terrell (m. 1882)
- Awards: Fellow of the British Academy (1924)

Gerard Baldwin Brown, FBA (31 October 1849 – 12 July 1932) was a British art historian.

== Life ==
Brown was born in London, the son of church minister James Baldwin Brown and his wife, Elizabeth, a sister of the sculptor Henry Leifchild. He attended Uppingham School before earning a scholarship to Oriel College, Oxford in 1869; graduating with degrees in classics in 1871 and literae humaniores (humanities) in 1873. That year Brown became a Fellow at Brasenose College in 1874, appointed in a teaching position, but he left in 1877 and took up studio painting at the National Art Training School in South Kensington (now the Royal College of Art).

He became the first holder of the Watson Gordon Chair of Fine Art at the University of Edinburgh in 1880 (the first chair in fine art in Britain) and held the chair until his retirement in 1930. In Edinburgh he lived initially at 3 Grosvenor Street in the west of the city before moving to 50 George Square.

It has been said that Brown's most significant work is the six-volume The Arts in Early England, which he started publishing in 1903 and was still working on when he died. The final volume was completed posthumously by Eric Hyde (Lord Sexton) in 1937. Brown also wrote an early review of historic preservation legislation in various European countries The Care of Ancient Monuments (1905), in which he made unfavourable comparisons between policies in Britain and in other European countries. The book came to the attention of Sir John Sinclair, Secretary for Scotland, and led to the establishment in February 1908 of the Royal Commission on the Ancient and Historical Monuments of Scotland (on which Brown served as one of the first Commissioners), followed by equivalent Royal Commissions for Wales and England. His The Glasgow School of Painters was published in 1908. Many of his books were illustrated by his wife, Maude Annie Terrell, a fellow artist, who he married in 1882.

Brown was elected a Fellow of the British Academy in 1924.

He was cremated and his ashes interred with his parents at West Norwood Cemetery.

== Other ==
A bust, sculpted by Pilkington Jackson is held in the Edinburgh University Art Collection and an etching of Brown by William Brassey Hole is in the collections of the National Portrait Gallery, London, the National Galleries of Scotland and the British Museum; the latter institute also holds a number of artefacts donated by Professor Brown.

Edinburgh University has a collection of Brown's papers and photographs in their archive and the Conway Library in The Courtauld Institute of Art, London holds photographs attributed to Brown in their collection of primarily architectural images. Both entities are in the process of digitising the photographs.

Brown bequeathed his collection of c.1000 books on fine art and archaeology to Edinburgh University Library.

== References and sources ==
Sources

- D. Talbot Rice, "Brown, Gerard Baldwin", Dictionary of National Biography (Supplement, 1949, available online together with new revision by Pimlott Baker, see below)
- D. Talbot Rice, rev. Anne Pimlott Baker, "Brown, Gerard Baldwin", Oxford Dictionary of National Biography, Oxford University Press, 2004, , accessed 23 July 2008
