= Alfred Chilton Pearson =

British classical scholar (1861–1935)

Alfred Chilton Pearson FBA
- Chalk drawing of Pearson in the collection of Trinity College, Cambridge
- Born: 8 August 1861; 23 Campden Hill Square, London
- Died: 2 January 1935 (aged 73)
- Occupations: Barrister; Schoolteacher; Classical scholar
- Spouse: Edith Maud Green (m. 1885; died 1930)

Academic background
- Education: King's College School, Wimbledon; Highgate School
- Alma mater: Christ's College, Cambridge
- Influences: John Peile

Academic work
- Institutions: University of Liverpool; Trinity College, Cambridge

Alfred Chilton Pearson FBA (8 October 1861 – 2 January 1935) was an English classical scholar, noted for his work on Greek tragedy. Born and schooled in London, Pearson graduated with distinction from Christ's College, Cambridge, before pursuing a career in law, business and teaching. In 1919, having published several books on ancient Greek philosophy and tragedy, he was elected as the Gladstone Professor of Greek at the University of Liverpool, and he subsequently became Regius Professor of Greek at the University of Cambridge in 1921.

Porson was elected a Fellow of the British Academy in 1924, the year in which he released his Oxford Classical Text of the works of the fifth-century tragedian Sophocles, but was forced to resign his academic post in 1928 by increasing ill-health. Following the death of his wife, Edith, in 1930, he moved successively to Hunstanton in Norfolk and to Kensington in London, where he died in 1935.

== Life ==
Alfred Chilton Pearson was born at 23 Campden Hill Square, London, on 8 October 1861. He was the only child of the merchant Robert Henry Pearson and his wife Georgina, née Boswood. Georgina Pearson died during Alfred's childhood.

After education at King's College School and Highgate School, Pearson went up to Christ's College, Cambridge, in 1879, on a scholarship. He read classics, and was taught by John Peile, from whom he learned Sanskrit. Pearson graduated with a double first in 1883, and married Edith Maud Green, the daughter of a solicitor, on 15 October 1885. The same year, he became a barrister at Lincoln's Inn. The Pearsons moved to Cambridge Gardens in London, and had a daughter in 1886 and a son, Robert, in 1888. During this time, Pearson supplemented his income by tutoring pupils in classics.

From 1890, Pearson spent ten years as a schoolmaster, teaching in Bury St Edmunds between 1890 and 1892, at Ipswich School in Suffolk as a sixth-form master in the 1892–1893 academic year, and, from 1893, at Dulwich College in London. His younger daughter, Margaret, was born in 1897. In 1900, following the death of his father in 1893 and that of his uncle in 1898, he moved to Warlingham in Surrey to take over the family business. From 1900, he served as an examiner for the Oxford and Cambridge Schools Examination Board; from 1914, he was also an examiner for the Civil Service Commission.

During and after his period as a teacher, Pearson produced school editions of Greek tragedies, including some of the plays of Sophocles, culminating in 1917 with his magnum opus, an edition of the Fragments of Sophocles, a work left unfinished by Richard Claverhouse Jebb at the time of his death. Pearson joined the council of the Classical Association in 1917. His first book, The Fragments of Zeno and Cleanthes, was awarded the Hare Prize at Cambridge in 1889 prior to its publication in 1891. His elder daughter died in 1918.

At the age of 58, and despite a life spent outside academia, Pearson was elected in 1919 as the Gladstone Professor of Greek at the University of Liverpool. He had been invited to apply by John Percival Postgate, the university's professor of Latin, and obtained a Doctor of Letters degree from Cambridge upon his appointment. In 1920, Pearson became the secretary of the Classical Association. He subsequently became in 1921 the Regius Professor of Greek at the University of Cambridge and a fellow of Trinity College. Shortly after his appointment, he became a governor of Dulwich College, a public school in London, and an honorary fellow of his alma mater, Christ's. In 1924, the year of his election as a Fellow of the British Academy, he published his edition of the works of Sophocles in the Oxford Classical Texts series, which remained in print until superseded in 1990 by the edition of Hugh Lloyd-Jones and N. G. Wilson.

From 1926, Pearson began to suffer from what his obituarist George Chatterton Richards called a "nervous condition", following the death of Postgate in a bicycle accident. In the same year, he was awarded an honorary Doctor of Letters degree by the University of Manchester. He resigned his professorship in 1928 on the grounds of ill health. His wife, Edith, died in 1930: Pearson's biographer and successor as Regius Professor, Donald Struan Robertson, states that he remained in "total incapacity" from that year until his death. In 1932, Pearson moved in with his son, Robert, at Hunstanton in Norfolk, in 1934, he moved again to 61 Queen's Gate, Kensington, where he died on 2 January 1935.

Pearson and his wife had a son and two daughters, one of whom died during Pearson's lifetime. He was a member of the National Liberal Club from the early 1900s, but had resigned his membership by 1923, saying that he expected to become "a crusted Tory" in his old age. He subsequently joined the Athenaeum. In 1914, he wrote to Robert that the First World War was "a terrible crime against humanity", but that Britain's involvement in it was required by "the cause of freedom and relief from military despotism". An inscription in his honour in the chapel of Trinity College commemorates him as "an exemplar of the Porsonian method".

== Publications ==
- The Fragments of Zeno and Cleanthes: With Introduction and Explanatory Notes, A. C. Pearson, ed., London: C. J. Clay and Sons and Cambridge University Press: 1891 (The Pitt Press Series).
- The Helena of Euripides, edited by A. C. Pearson, Cambridge University Press: 1903 (The Pitt Press Series)
- Euripides: The Heraclidae, edited by A. C. Pearson, Cambridge University Press: 1903 (The Pitt Press Series)
- Euripides: The Phoenissae, edited by A. C. Pearson, Cambridge University Press: 1909 (The Pitt Press Series)
- The Ajax of Sophocles, edited by A. C. Pearson based on the edition of R. C. Jebb, Cambridge University Press, 1912
- Fragments of Sophocles – Edited With Additional Notes From the Papers of Sir R. C. Jebb and W. G. Headlam, 3 volumes, Cambridge University Press, 1917
- Sophoclis Fabulae recognovit brevique adnotatione critica instruxit A.C. Pearson – Oxford Classical Text, Clarendon Press, 1924

== Notes ==
Academic offices
Preceded by Carl Ferdinand Friedrich Lehmann-Haupt	Gladstone Professor of Greek Liverpool University; 1919–1921	Succeeded by A. Y. Campbell
Preceded by Henry Jackson	Regius Professor of Greek Cambridge University; 1921–1928	Succeeded by Donald Struan Robertson
