= Gilbert Austin Davies =

English classical scholar (1868–1948)

Gilbert Austin Davies (15 September 1868 – 26 July 1948) was an English classical scholar.

== Life ==
Davies was born in London. After education at Aldenham Grammar School and Owen’s College, Manchester, Davies went up to Trinity College, Cambridge, as a scholar in 1887. He began his academic career at Trinity, where he was a Fellow from 1892 to 1898, during which time he produced a school edition of the first book of Tacitus's Histories in 1896.

In 1898 he was appointed as the second Gladstone Professor of Greek at the still new University of Liverpool before moving in 1906 to the more long-established chair in Greek at the University of Glasgow, a position he held until retirement in 1934. His service in Glasgow was interposed by voluntary work during the First World War for the Serbian Relief Fund, for which he received the award of the Serbian Order of St Sava.

Davies produced abridged versions of the commentaries of Jebb on two of Sophocles' plays, Trachiniai and Electra, both of which have been reprinted in 2010, and an edition of the First, Second and Third Philippics of Demosthenes.

Academic offices
Preceded by Gerald Henry Rendall	Gladstone Professor of Greek Liverpool University; 1898 - 1906	Succeeded by Sir John Linton Myres
Preceded by John Swinnerton Phillimore	Professor of Greek Glasgow University; 1906 - 1934	Succeeded by William Rennie
