= Alexander Rice =

Alexander Rice may refer to:

- Alexander H. Rice (1818–1895), American politician and businessman from Massachusetts
- Alexander H. Rice (explorer) (1875–1956), American physician, geographer, and explorer
- Alexander Talbot Rice (born 1969), British society portrait artist
