= James Baldwin Brown =

British Congregational minister (1820–1884)

James Baldwin Brown (1820–1884) was a British Congregational minister.

== Life ==
He was the eldest son of James Baldwin Brown the elder (1785–1843), barrister and writer. In 1839 he was one of the first to graduate from the University of London. He was Minister in Derby, in 1843, at Claylands Chapel, Clapham Road, in 1846, and at Brixton Independent Chapel, Brixton Road, from 1870 until his death.

Brown was famous at the time for his liberal philosophical views, both in the pulpit and in the press, and the numerous religious works that he published.

He lived at 5 The Paragon, in Streatham Hill, and died at Coombe House, Kingston Hill, Surrey, on 23 June 1884. He married a sister of the sculptor Henry Leifchild, and they were parents of Gerard Baldwin Brown, the art historian. He was buried at West Norwood Cemetery, where his memorial was a large Celtic cross, listed Grade II.

== Selected writings ==
- Competition, the Labour Market, and Christianity (1851)
- The Divine Life in Man (London, 1859)
- The Doctrine of the Divine Fatherhood in Relation to the Atonement (1860)
- The Soul's Exodus and Pilgrimage (1862)
- The Divine Treatment of Sin (1864)
- The Home Life in the Light of its Divine Idea (1866)
- Idolatries, Old and New, their Cause and Cure (1867)
- The First Principles of Ecclesiastical Truth (1871)
- The Higher Life, its Reality, Experience, and Destiny (1874)
- The Doctrine of Annihilation in the Light of the Gospel of Love (1875)
- Home, its Relation to Man and Society (1883)
- Stoics and Saints (London, 1893)

== Sources ==
- Obituary, The Times, 25 June 1884
