= Giles Henry Robertson =

Giles Henry Robertson FRSE RSA (Hon) (1913–1987) was a 20th-century British art historian and expert on the Italian Renaissance.

== Life ==
He was born in Cambridge in 1913 the son of Prof Donald Struan Robertson, professor of Greek at Cambridge University. His elder brother was Martin Robertson. Giles was educated at the Leys School in Cambridge then read classics at Oxford University.

In the Second World War he was first conscripted into a searchlight unit, then reassigned to Bletchley Park in 1941. At the end of hostilities in Europe he joined the Monuments, Fine Arts, and Archives program team (the "Monuments Men") to track art treasures hidden by the Nazis or looted by Allied troops. In September 1945 this included locating stolen treasures in Vorden and Corvey (previously belonging in the Landmuseum in Munster) and transferring these to Schloss Nordkirchen.

Late in 1946 he began lecturing in fine art history at Edinburgh University. He was promoted several times eventually holding the Watson Gordon Chair of Fine Art in 1972, remaining in this post until retirement in 1981. In 1975 he guided the construction and opening of the Talbot Rice Gallery, named after his predecessor Professor David Talbot Rice.

In 1982 he was elected a fellow of the Royal Society of Edinburgh. His proposers were John Cameron, Lord Cameron, John McIntyre, Neil Campbell and Colin Thompson.

He died at Vaucluse in France on 22 September 1987.

In 1998 his family donated his library of over 1200 art books to Edinburgh University.

== Publications ==
- Vincenzo Catena (1954)
- Giovanni Bellini (1968)
- Artist and Art Historian (1972)
- Studies in Memory of David Talbot Rice (1975)
- Aleksander Zyw (1975)
