= Watson Gordon Professor of Fine Art =

The Watson Gordon Chair of Fine Art is a professorship at the University of Edinburgh.

== History ==
The chair was founded in 1880. John Watson Gordon was a Scottish painter who died in 1864. His brother and sister endowed the professorship in his memory in 1879. The establishment of the chair resulted in progress in the teaching of art history.

== Professors ==
- Gerard Baldwin Brown 1880–1930
- Herbert Read 1931–1933
- David Talbot Rice 1934–1972
- Giles Robertson 1973–1981
- Eric Fernie 1984–1995
- Richard Thomson 1996–
