= James Lambert (scholar) =

English scholar (1741 - 1823)

James Lambert (7 March 1742 – 8 April 1823) was an English scholar, who served as Regius Professor of Greek at the University of Cambridge from 1771 to 1780.

== Early life ==
James Lambert was the son of Thomas Lambert, vicar of Thorp, near Harwich, and afterwards rector of Melton, Suffolk. Thomas Lambert was a member of Trinity College, Cambridge (B.A. 1723), and the son, after being educated at the grammar school of Woodbridge, was entered at Trinity College on 23 April 1750.

Lambert graduated B.A. as tenth wrangler and senior medallist in 1764, and was awarded the M.A. in 1767, having obtained a fellowship in 1766.

== Career ==
For a short time Lambert served as curate of Alderton and Bawdrey, near Woodbridge. He was assistant tutor of Trinity College for some years, and on 7 March 1771 was elected Regius Professor of Greek, after delivering a prelection De Euripide aliisque qui Philosophiam Socraticam scriptis suis illustravisse videntur ("On Euripides and others who seem to have elucidated the philosophy of Socrates through their writings"). There was no other candidate.

In 1773, through Mr. Carthew of Woodbridge, Richard Porson was sent to him at Cambridge to be tested as to his fitness to receive the education that Porson's benefactor John Norris was proposing to give him. It was through Lambert's means that Porson was examined by the Trinity tutors, and was in consequence sent to Eton College.

Lambert gave up his assistant tutorship in 1775, and for some years superintended the education of Sir John Fleming Leicester, returning to college with his pupil in 1782. He resigned the Greek professorship on 24 June 1780. He was a strong supporter of Mr. Jebb of Peterhouse in his proposal for annual examinations at Cambridge, and was a member of the syndicate appointed in 1774 to consider schemes for this and other improvements in the university course of education; their proposals, however, were all thrown out by narrow majorities in the senate. In 1789 he was appointed bursar of his college, and held the office for ten years.

Lambert latterly adopted Arian opinions, and never accepted any preferment in the church, but he kept his fellowship till his death.

== Death ==
Lambert died on 8 April 1823 at Fersfield, Norfolk, where he is buried. His portrait is in the smaller combination room at Trinity College.

== Legacy ==
Long Road, a road to the south of central Cambridge connecting Trumpington Road and Hills Road, was still known in the late nineteenth century by the name of the "Via Lambertina".
