= John Peile =

English writer and philologist (1838–1910)

John Peile FBA
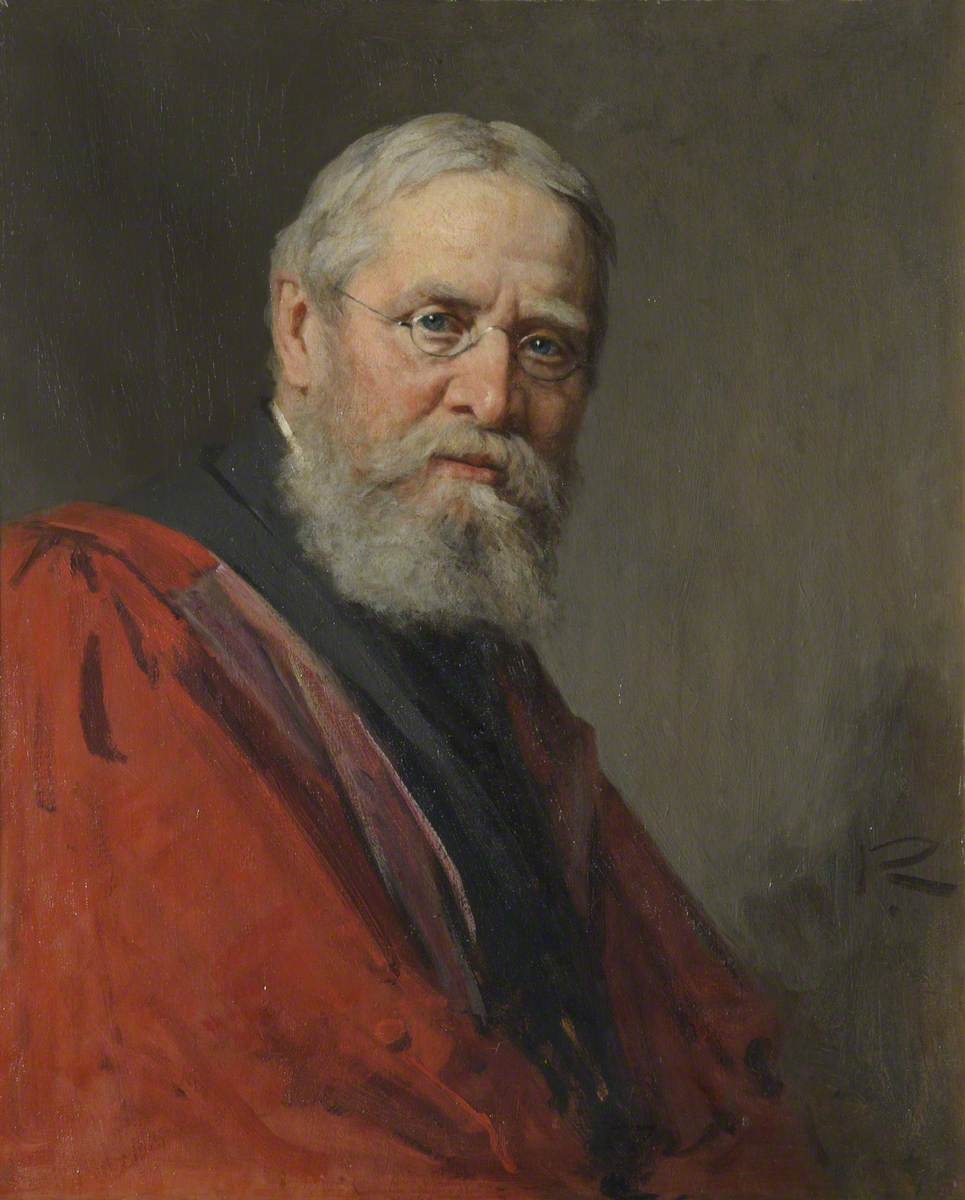
- Painted by George Reid, c. 1902
- Born: 24 April 1838; Whitehaven, Cumberland, England
- Died: 9 October 1910 (aged 72); Cambridge, England
- Relatives: Sir James Braithwaite Peile (cousin)

Academic background
- Education: Repton School; St Bees School
- Alma mater: Christ's College, Cambridge

Academic work
- Discipline: Philology
- Institutions: Christ's College, Cambridge
- Influenced: Alfred Chilton Pearson

Master of Christ's College, Cambridge
- In office 1887–1910
- Preceded by: Charles Anthony Swainson
- Succeeded by: Arthur Shipley

John Peile (24 April 1838 – 9 October 1910) was an English writer and philologist. His book Philology (1877) provided a description on how words originate, the different parts of speech, the syntax, and the way in which language evolves. He served as Master of Christ's College and Vice-Chancellor of the University of Cambridge. He published other books including Introduction to Greek and Latin Etymology (1869) and Notes on the Tale of Nala (1881). He collaborated with Walter William Skeat and taught Alfred Chilton Pearson.

== Life ==
John Peile was born at Whitehaven, the son of geologist Williamson Peile, F.G.S., who died when his son was five years old.

He was educated at Repton School (under the headmastership of his uncle, Thomas Williamson Peile, father of Sir James Braithwaite Peile), St. Bees School and Christ's College, Cambridge. After a distinguished career (Craven Scholar, Senior Classic and First Chancellor's Medallist), he became Fellow and Tutor of his college, Reader of Comparative Philology in the university (1884–1891), and in 1887 was elected Master of Christ's. He took a great interest in the higher education of women and became president of Newnham College. He was the first to introduce the great philological works of Georg Curtius and Wilhelm Corssen to Anglophone students in his Introduction to Greek and Latin Etymology (1869). Among Peile's students was Alfred Chilton Pearson, who learned Sanskrit from him following his matriculation at Christ's in 1879. Peile died in Cambridge in October 1910, leaving practically completed his exhaustive history of Christ's College, which was published in 1913.

In 1866 he married Annette, daughter of William Cripps Kitchener. They had two children who died in infancy, two further sons, and a daughter.

== Selected publications ==
- An Introduction to Greek and Latin Etymology (3rd & corrected ed.). Macmillan and Company. 1875.
- Philology. Appleton. 1879.
- Christ's College. F. E. Robinson & Company. 1900.

== Sources ==
- Giles, Peter (1912). "Peile, John" . In Lee, Sidney (ed.). Dictionary of National Biography (2nd supplement). London: Smith, Elder & Co.
- Giles, Peter; Pickles, John D. "Peile, John (1838–1910)". Oxford Dictionary of National Biography (online ed.). Oxford University Press. doi:10.1093/ref:odnb/35458. (Subscription, Wikipedia Library access or UK public library membership required.)
- Robertson, D. S.; Pottle, Mark (23 September 2004). "Pearson, Alfred Chilton". Oxford Dictionary of National Biography (online ed.). Oxford University Press. doi:10.1093/ref:odnb/35439. (Subscription, Wikipedia Library access or UK public library membership required.)

Academic offices
Preceded by Charles Anthony Swainson	Master of Christ's College, Cambridge; 1887–1910	Succeeded by Arthur Shipley
Preceded by Henry Montagu Butler	Vice-Chancellor of the University of Cambridge; 1891–1892	Succeeded by Augustus Austen Leigh
