= Alexander Talbot Rice =

British painter

Alexander Talbot-Rice
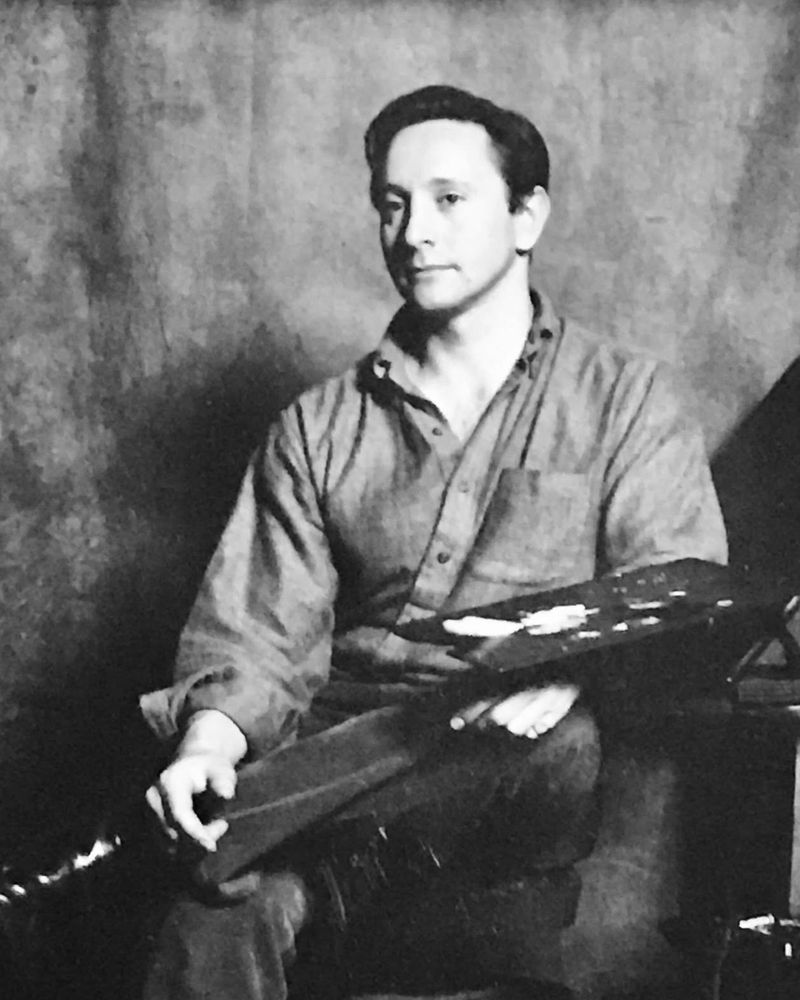
- Education: Stowe School; Durham University; Florence Academy of Art; The Repin Academy of Art
- Notable work: H.M. The Queen; H.R.H. The Duke of Edinburgh; Lady Thatcher; HH Pope Benedict XVI
- Website: alextalbotrice.com

Alexander Thomas Talbot-Rice is a British society portrait artist who specializes in the classical techniques of the genre. He has been classically trained at two of the world's most prestigious art institutions, namely, The Florence Academy of Art and The Repin Academy of Art in St. Petersburg. His style is rooted in the naturalistic tradition and is known for its ability to capture the character and humanity of his subjects. His extensive body of work includes notable portraits of H.M. The Queen, H.R.H. The Duke of Edinburgh, and Lady Thatcher, among others.

== Personal ==
Talbot-Rice is the son of David Arthur and Sylvia Dorothea Talbot-Rice and grand-nephew of art historian David Talbot Rice. Alexander's artistic journey began as a child, when he fell in love with art under the tutelage of a gifted art teacher, Mrs. Rothery, at the strict prep-boarding school in Sussex, called Temple Grove. At the age of thirteen, he received the top Art Scholarship to Stowe School in Buckinghamshire. Later, he pursued a degree in Politics, Philosophy, and History at Durham University, where he graduated with honors. However, he decided to embark on a career in Fine Art, and in 1995, he obtained a scholarship to train as an artist in Florence at The Charles Cecil School and The Florence Academy of Art. In 2000-2002 he was one of the first westerners to study at The Repin Academy of Art.

== Career ==
In 2005 he painted the portrait of Queen Elizabeth II on the occasion of her Golden Jubilee, depicted HM the Coronation Coach at the Royal Mews of Buckingham Palace. He has also painted portraits of Margaret Thatcher, Prince Philip, Duke of Edinburgh and Pope Benedict XVI. In 2007 he exhibited at the National Portrait Gallery in Washington, US.

In 2012 he was an official war artist with the British Army during the war in Afghanistan.

== Exhibitions ==
- 2004 - HRH The Duke of Edinburgh - Windsor Castle
- 2005 - HM The Queen - The Worshipful Company Ironmongers
- 2006 - President Salva Kiir - Juba, Southern Sudan
- 2007 - The Smithsonian "Great Britons" - The National Portrait Gallery, Washington DC
- 2008 - Alexander Talbot Rice Academy - Dinefwr Castle, Wales
- 2009 - Bobby Short - The Carlyle Hotel, New York
- 2012 - Drawing from Afganistan - London
- 2013 - Lady Thatcher - London
- 2014 - The Hong Kong Jockey Club - Central Museum, Hong Kong
- 2015 - Mikhail Borisovich Piotrovsky - The Hermitage Museum, St. Petersburg
- 2016 - Invictus - The Dorchester
- 2018 - Exhibition Gala - The Cavalry and Guards Club
- 2022 - Icons from The Marinsky Ballet - The HUB, Hong Kong
