= Agnes Arber =

British botanist (1879–1960)

- Arber in 1916
- Born: Agnes Robertson; 23 February 1879; Primrose Hill, London, England
- Died: 22 March 1960 (aged 81); Cambridge, England
- Education: University College London, (BSc, 1899); Newnham College (1902); University College, London (Sc.D., 1905)
- Spouse: Edward Alexander Newell Arber (m. 1909)
- Children: Muriel Agnes (1913–2004)
- Awards: Linnean Medal of the Linnean Society of London (1948)
- Scientific career
- Fields: Plant morphology, plant anatomy
- Author abbrev. (botany): A.Arber

Agnes Arber FRS (née Robertson; 23 February 1879 – 22 March 1960) was a British plant morphologist and anatomist, historian of botany and philosopher of biology. She was born in London but lived most of her life in Cambridge, including the last 51 years of her life. She was the first woman botanist to be elected as a Fellow of the Royal Society (21 March 1946, at the age of 67) and the third woman overall. She was the first woman to receive the Gold Medal of the Linnean Society of London.

Her scientific research focused on the monocotyledon group of flowering plants. She also contributed to development of morphological studies in botany during the early part of the 20th century. Her later work concentrated on the topic of philosophy in botany, particularly on the nature of biological research.

== Personal life and education ==
Agnes Robertson was born on 23 February 1879 in Primrose Hill, London. She was the first child of Henry Robert Robertson, an artist, and Agnes Lucy Turner, and had three younger siblings, Donald Struan Robertson (who later became Regius Professor of Greek in the University of Cambridge), Janet Robertson, who later became a portrait painter, and Margaret Robertson (married name Hills), who was a notable suffragist and local politician. Her father gave her regular drawing lessons during her early childhood, which later provided her with the necessary skills to illustrate her scientific publications herself.

At the age of eight Robertson began attending the North London Collegiate School founded and run by Frances Buss, one of the leading proponents for girls' education. Under the direction of the school's science teacher Edith Aitken, Robertson discovered a fascination with botany, publishing her first piece of research in 1894 in the school's magazine and later coming first in the school's botany examinations, winning a scholarship.

It was here that Robertson first met Ethel Sargant, a plant morphologist who gave regular presentations to the school science club. Sargant would later become her mentor and colleague, having a profound influence on Arber's research interests and methods.

In 1897, Robertson began studying at University College, London, gaining her BSc in 1899. After gaining an entrance scholarship Arber became a member of Newnham College, Cambridge and took a further degree in Natural Sciences. She gained first class results in every examination at both universities, along with several prizes and medals from University College, London.

After finishing her Cambridge degree in 1902 Robertson worked in the private laboratory of Ethel Sargant for a year, before returning to University College, London as holder of the Quain Studentship in Biology. She was awarded a Doctorate of Science in 1905.

Robertson met Edward Alexander Newell Arber (1870–1918) while studying at Newnham College. They married on 5 August 1909, and moved back to Cambridge, where she would remain for the rest of her life. Her only child, Muriel Agnes Arber, was born in 1913, became a geologist, and died in 2004.

Arber and her husband had many interests in common, and her marriage was described as 'happy'. Arber was awarded a Research Fellowship from Newnham College in 1912 and published her first book Herbals, their origin and evolution in the same year. Her husband Newall Arber died in 1918 following a period of ill health. Arber never remarried, but continued with her research. She studied in the Balfour Biological Laboratory for Women from her marriage until the laboratory's closure in 1927. Arber maintained a small laboratory in a back room of her house from then until she stopped performing bench research in the 1940s and turned to philosophical study.

Agnes Arber died on 22 March 1960, at the age of 81, and is buried in the churchyard of St Andrew's, Girton.

== Scientific career ==
=== Early career ===
Before attending University College, London Arber spent the summer of 1897 working with Ethel Sargant in her private laboratory in Reigate, where Sargant instructed her on microtechniques used to prepare plant specimens for microscopic examination. Arber returned to work in Sargant's laboratory at least once during the summer holidays while she was studying at University College London. Sargant employed Arber between 1902 and 1903 as a research assistant working on seedling structures, during which time in 1903 she published her first paper 'Notes on the anatomy of Macrozamia heteromera' in Proceedings of the Cambridge Philosophical Society. Whilst at University College London Arber conducted research on the gymnosperm group of plants, producing several papers on their morphology and anatomy. The study and philosophy of plant morphology would become the central focus of her later work.

=== Balfour Laboratory, Cambridge ===
In 1909 Arber was granted space in the Balfour Laboratory for Women by Newnham College. This building had been purchased and founded by the two women's colleges of the university in 1884 for the use of their students and researchers (women at this time were not permitted to attend laboratory demonstrations and practical classes). Arber worked in the laboratory until its closure in 1927.

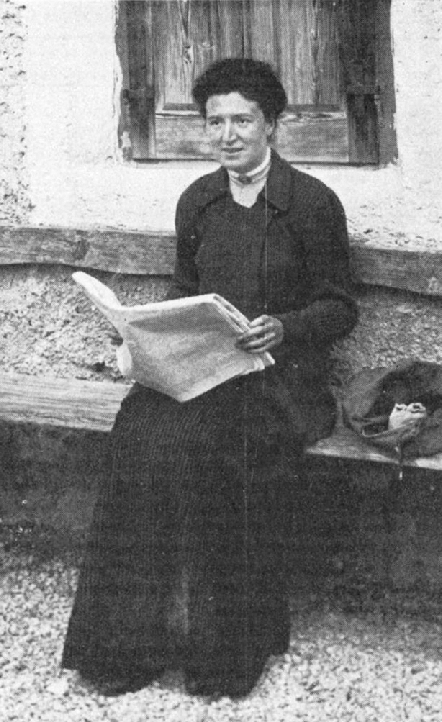
Photo of Arber in 1911

Following the award of a Research Fellowship by Newnham College between 1912 and 1913 Arber published her first book in 1912. Herbals, their origin and evolution describes the transformation of printed Herbals between 1470 and 1670. Arber links the emergence and development of botany as a discipline within natural history with the evolution of plant descriptions, classifications and identifications seen in Herbals during this period. Arber was able to consult the large collection of printed Herbals in the library of the Botany School at Cambridge as part of her research for this work. It was largely re-written and expanded for a second edition published in 1938, was published as a third edition in 1986 and is still considered the standard work for the history of Herbals.

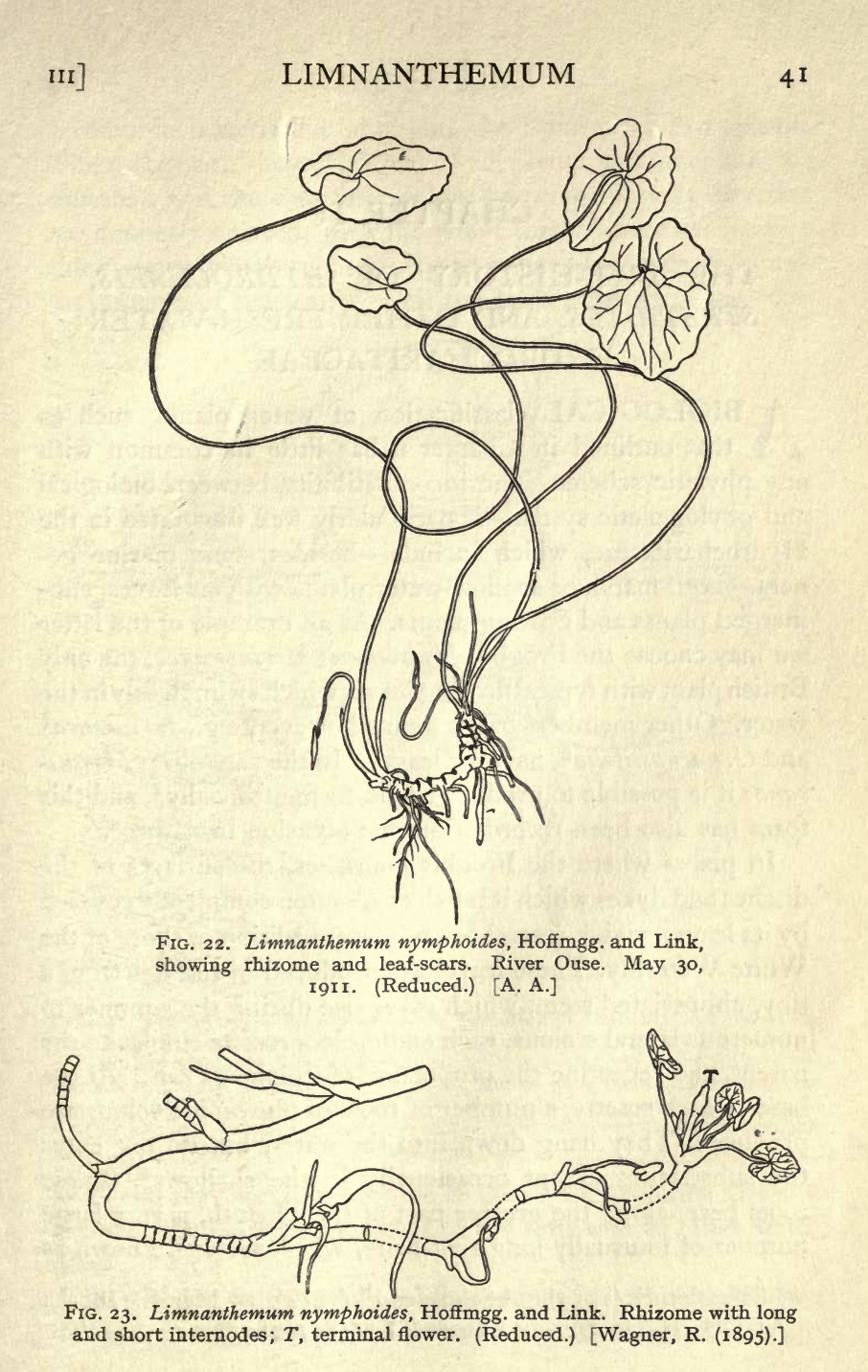
Illustration of Limnanthemum from Water Plants A Study of Aquatic Angiosperms by Agnes Arber

Arber focused her research on the anatomy and morphology of the monocot group of plants, which she had originally been introduced to by Ethel Sargant. By 1920 she had authored two books and 94 other publications. Her second book Water Plants: A Study of Aquatic Angiosperms was published in 1920. In this book Arber presents a comparative study of aquatic plants by analysing differences in their morphology. Arber also provides interpretations of the general principles she used to create her analysis. Her study was the first to provide a general description and interpretation of aquatic plants. She was an excellent draughtsperson and often illustrated her books herself; she drew about a third of the illustrations in Water Plants.

In 1921, the "botanical establishment" denied Arber the 1921 presidency of British association for the advancement of science (BAAS)'s Botany section (Section K). This process was initiated by Frederick Orpen Bower, based on the premise that Arber should not follow Saunders immediately as president as both were women from Cambridge and that there were more senior male botanists up for the presidency. This reflected an antipathy against Arber not only as a female botanist but also as a Cambridge botanist. He claimed that Edinburgh (where the meeting was held) "has the right to expect better than this... To ask Balfour [of Edinburgh] to sit under the Presidency of Mrs. Arber is ridiculous!" Albert Seward met with Arber, who withdrew her candidacy and resigned as the secretary of the BAAS.

In 1925 Arber published her third book The Monocotyledons. The Editors of the Cambridge Botanical Handbooks series had asked Ethel Sargant in 1910 to prepare a volume on the monocots for this series. However ill-health and advancing years made it almost impossible for Sargant to complete the book, and in 1918 she suggested Arber to complete the work. The Monocotyledons continues Arber's morphological methods of analysis she presented in Water Plants. She provides a detailed study of the monocot plants from comparing their internal and external anatomy. However her discussion of the general principles she uses in her analysis are more explicit in this volume, as she discusses the methods and philosophy of morphological study. Although comparative anatomical analysis as demonstrated in The Monocotyledons and Water Plants: A Study of Aquatic Angiosperms was central to botanical investigation in the early 20th century, there were distinct differences between British and European researchers concerning the aims of morphological study. Arber addressed this by creating a distinction between "pure" and "applied" morphology, with her work focusing on comparative anatomy to investigate questions concerning significant topics such as constructing phylogenies, instead of using traditional views of plant structure. This view was further developed in her later work.

=== Later work ===
After the 1927 closure of the Balfour Laboratory Arber set up a small laboratory in a back room of her house to conduct her research, after the resident head of the Botany School Professor Albert Seward claimed there was no space in the School for Arber to continue her research using its facilities. Arber had been introduced to the idea of private research from her time spent with Ethel Sargant in 1902–1903, and from later comments to members of Girton College Natural Sciences club and in letters to friends she stated she liked working at home due to challenges posed by independent research, despite not originally making the choice herself.

After the publication of The Monocotyledons Arber continued her research into this group, concentrating her research into the Gramineae family of plants, especially cereals, grasses and bamboo. This led to the publication of her final book concerning plant morphology, The Gramineae in 1934. In this book Arber described the life cycles, embryology and reproductive and vegetative cycles of cereals, grasses and bamboo using comparative anatomical analysis of these plants. Recognising the importance of these plants to the development of human societies, Arber begins this study with the history of these plants in relation to humans, with "the more strictly botanical aspect is treated as developing out of the humanistic". The book was preceded by 10 papers in The Annals of Botany detailing the results of her research.

Between 1930 and 1942 Arber conducted research into the structure of flowers, where she investigated the structure of many different forms and used morphological information to interpret other flower structures. Her results were published in 10 review papers spanning this period. In 1937 she published a summary of the morphological ideas which had been discussed concerning floral structure, which was considered an important review article for morphological studies.

In January 1942 Arber published her last paper involving original botanical research. All of her subsequent publications were entirely concerned with historical and philosophical topics.

== Philosophical studies ==
During the Second World War Arber found it difficult to maintain her small laboratory, due to health problems and supplies were becoming more difficult to obtain. Further, she did not believe it was "fair to her neighbours" to have flammable laboratory materials in her home while there was a danger of wartime bombing. This led to her decision to stop performing laboratory work and to concentrate more on philosophical and historical issues. Arber published work on historical botanists, including a comparison between Nehemiah Grew and Marcello Malpighi in 1942, John Ray in 1943 and Sir Joseph Banks in 1945.

Arber had been introduced to the work of Goethe while at school and remained fascinated by his ideas about botany. In 1946 she published Goethe's Botany, a translation of Goethe's Metamorphosis of Plants (1790) and Georg Christoph Tobler's (1757–1812) Die Natur with an introduction and interpretation of the texts.

The Natural Philosophy of Plant Form, published in 1950 has been considered the most important of Arber's books. It has been described as "a magisterial survey of two thousand years of biological tradition". Arber discusses the processes behind forming a concept from research and examines the philosophy of plant morphology. Arber uses this to examine the structure of flowering plants, and proposes the partial-shoot theory of the leaf. According to this theory, each element of the plant is a shoot or a partial shoot. Leaves are partial shoots that show reduced growth capacity. She mentions: "the leaf is a partial-shoot, revealing an inherent urge towards becoming a whole shoot, but never actually attaining this goal, since radial symmetry and the capacity for apical growth suffer inhibition". The parallelism of leaf and shoot dates back to Goethe, who first described compound leaves as in "reality branches, the buds of which cannot develop, since the common stalk is too frail". For Arber, compound leaves are clusters of united partial-shoots. Recent developmental genetic evidence has supported aspects of the partial shoot-theory of the leaf, especially in the case of compound leaves.

Her studies on the philosophy of plant morphology led her to take a broader view of the links between science and philosophy. The Mind and the Eye: A Biologist's Standpoint published in 1954 provides an introduction to biological research and develops a methodology for performing this research. Arber describes research as taking place in six stages: the identification of research question or topic; the collection of data through experiments or observation; the interpretation of the data; testing the validity of the interpretation; communicating the results; and considering the research in context. For Arber, the context includes interpreting the result in terms of history and philosophy and covers half of the book. Arber's book is distinctive in that it was written before Thomas Kuhn demonstrated that scientist's views are influenced by the views of others in their field and before Ernst Mayr's criticism of describing the philosophy of biology in the same way as the philosophy of physics.

Her final book, The Manifold and the One published in 1957 is concerned with wider philosophical questions. The book is a wide-ranging and syncretic survey, drawing on literary, scientific, religious, mystical and philosophical traditions, incorporating Buddhist, Hindu and Taoist philosophy with European philosophy., in pursuit of a discussion of the mystical experience which Arber defines as "that direct and unmediated contemplation which is characterised by a peculiarly intense awareness of a Whole as the Unity of all things".

== Recognition and awards ==
In 1921 she accepted the annual position as president of the botany section of the British Association for the Advancement of Science, following Edith Saunders the previous year, but soon resigned after some members indicated that they did not want two successive women presidents. When she was offered the presidency again in 1926, she did not accept.

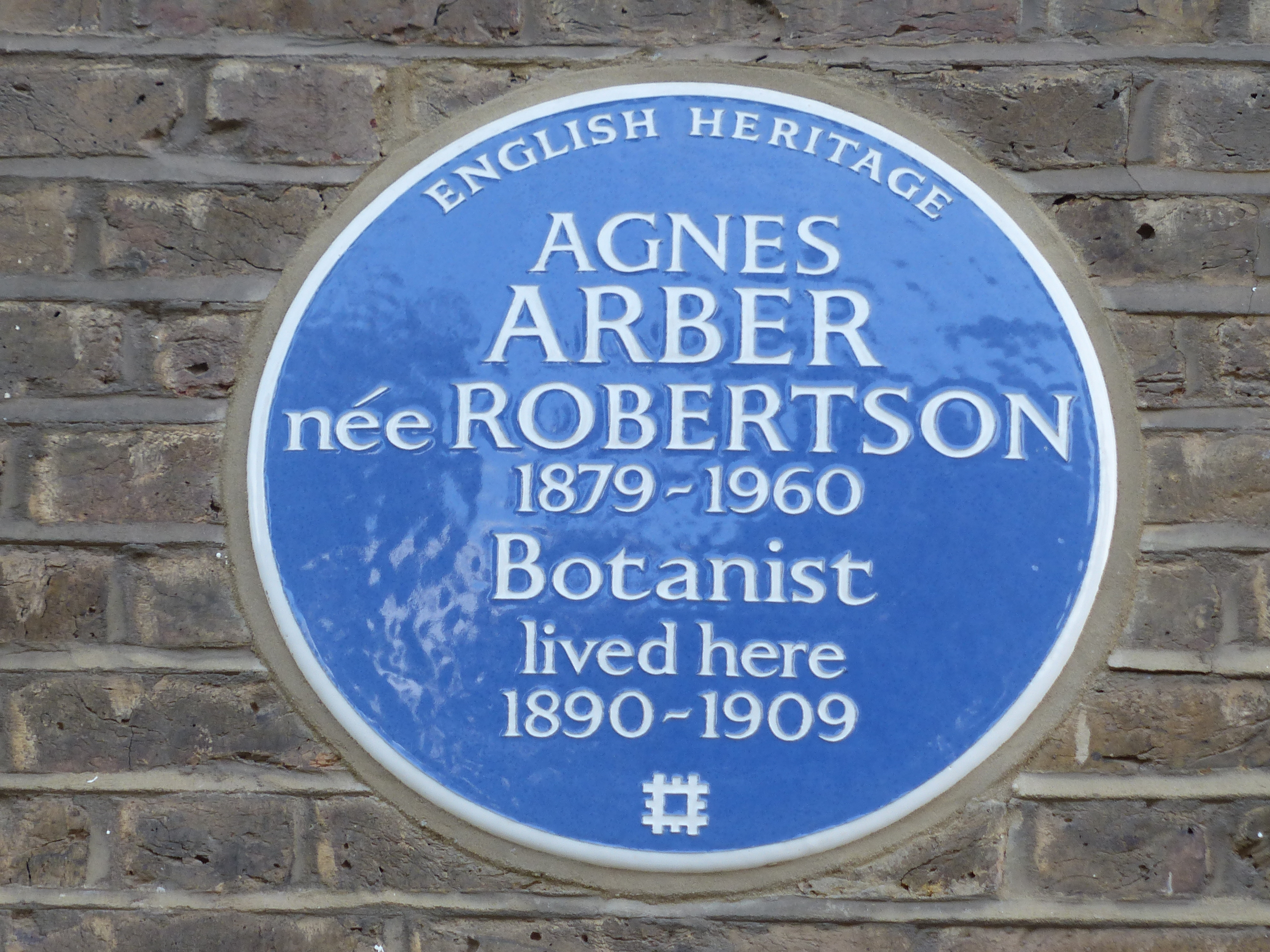
Plaque at 9 Elsworthy Terrace, Primrose Hill, London

In 1946 she was elected a Fellow of the Royal Society. She was the first woman botanist and third woman overall to receive this honor. In 1948 she was awarded the Gold Medal of the Linnean Society of London.

== Legacy ==
In February 1961, Muriel Arber donated some of her mother's surviving materials to the Hunt Institute for Botanical Documentation.

A blue plaque was installed on her childhood home (9 Elsworthy Terrace, Primrose Hill, London) in 2018. In 2024 one was attached to her Cambridge home where she also carried out much of her research.

There is also a brand of gin named in her honour.

In May 2024, a new sponsored Agnes Arber PhD thesis prize in comparative biology at the University of Cambridge was created. Professor Sam Brockington, of Cambridge University Botanic Gardens, said that he hoped the prize "will support the next generation of pioneering botanists, following in the footsteps of Agnes".

== Selected publications ==
- Arber, Agnes (1912). Herbals: their origin and evolution. A chapter in the history of botany, 1470–1670 (1st ed.). Cambridge University Press. Archived from the original on 1 October 2017.
  - Arber, Agnes (1938) [1912 (reissue 1953)]. Herbals: their origin and evolution. A chapter in the history of botany, 1470–1670 (2nd ed.). Cambridge University Press. ISBN 978-1-108-01671-1.
  - Arber, Agnes (1986) [1912; 2nd ed. 1938]. Stearn, William T. (ed.). Herbals: their origin and evolution. A chapter in the history of botany, 1470–1670 (3rd ed.). Cambridge: Cambridge University Press. ISBN 978-0-521-33879-0.
- Arber, A. (1920). Water Plants: A Study of Aquatic Angiosperms. Cambridge. doi:10.5962/bhl.title.95477.
- Arber, Agnes (1925). Monocotyledons: a morphological study. Cambridge University Press. ISBN 9781108013208.
- Arber, A. (1934). The Gramineae. Cambridge.
- Arber, Agnes (1950). The Natural Philosophy of Plant Form. CUP Archive. GGKEY:HCBB8RZREL4.
- Arber, A. (1954). The Mind and The Eye. Cambridge.
- Arber, A. (1957). The Manifold and the One. John Murray.

== See also ==
- Dorothea Pertz, for whom Agnes Arber wrote an obituary

== Bibliography ==
- Godwin, Harry (1970). "Arber, Agnes Robertson". Dictionary of Scientific Biography. Vol. 1. New York: Charles Scribner's Sons. pp. 205–206. ISBN 978-0-684-10114-9.
- Special issue dedicated to Agnes Arber: Annals of Botany, December 2001, Vol.88 No.6
  - Schmid, R. (December 2001). "Agnes Arber, née Robertson (1879–1960): Fragments of her Life, Including her Place in Biology and in Women's Studies". Annals of Botany. 88 (6): 1105–1128. Bibcode:2001AnBot..88.1105S. doi:10.1006/anbo.2001.1553. Archived from the original on 31 May 2024.
- Stearn, W. T. (December 1960). "Mrs. Agnes Arber: Botanist and Philosopher, 1879 - 1960". Taxon (Reprint of obituary in The Times 24 March 1960). 9 (9): 261–263. doi:10.1002/j.1996-8175.1960.tb02799.x. JSTOR 1217828.
- Friend, Peter (2012). "Muriel Agnes Arber, 1913–2004" (Obituary). The Geological Society. Archived from the original on 11 February 2017.
- Schmid, Rudi (May 2008). "Agnes Arber and other early women botanists". Archived from the original on 4 July 2017.
  - "Pictures of Agnes Arber and her associates". rudischmid.com. Archived from the original on 11 February 2017.
- Arber, Muriel A.; Stearn, William T. (1 January 1968). "List of published works of Agnes Arber, E. A.N. Arber and Ethel Sargant". Journal of the Society for the Bibliography of Natural History. 4 (7): 370–384. doi:10.3366/jsbnh.1968.4.7.370. ISSN 0037-9778. Archived from the original on 1 February 2022. Biographical notes by W. T. Stearn
