= Bartholomew Dodington =

Bartholomew Dodington (c.1535 – 22 August 1595) was an English classical scholar who served as the Regius Professor of Greek at the University of Cambridge from 1562 to 1585.

Dodington was born in Middlesex and attended St John's College, Cambridge; and made Greek and Latin orations for Elizabeth I when she visited Cambridge. In 1571 he published an edition of Nicholas Carr's Demosthenes as well as contributing to other classical works of literature.

The inscription on his tomb was recorded as describing him as having been "...nourished from boyhood on the finest arts...a man not only of excellent scholarship, but also of a most holy character, of singular integrity, and incomparable modesty."

Doddington was buried at Westminster Abbey, in the north transept, though the exact location of his grave is no longer known.
