= Donald Struan Robertson =

British classical scholar (1885–1961)

Donald Struan Robertson FBA
- Photographed at an unknown date
- Born: 28 June 1885; London, England
- Died: 5 October 1961 (aged 76); Cambridge, England
- Occupation: Classical scholar
- Spouses: Petica Coursolles Jones (m. 1909; died 1941) Margaret Ann Carey (m. 1956)
- Children: Charles Martin Robertson; Giles Henry Robertson
- Relatives: Agnes Arber (sister); Margaret Hills (sister)

Academic background
- Education: Westminster School; Trinity College, Cambridge

Academic work
- Institutions: Trinity College, Cambridge
- Military career
- Allegiance: United Kingdom
- Branch: British Army
- Rank: Major
- Unit: Royal Army Service Corps
- Wars: First World War

Donald Struan Robertson FBA (28 June 1885 – 5 October 1961) was a classical scholar, particularly noted for his work on Apuleius, and for 22 years the Regius Professor of Greek at the University of Cambridge. He was the father of the classicist Charles Martin Robertson and the art historian Giles Henry Robertson, and the brother of the botanist Agnes Arber.

== Life ==
Robertson was born in London, the son of Agnes Lucy Turner, a descendant of Robert Chamberlain, a ceramicist, and Henry Robert Robertson, an artist. After education as a day pupil at Westminster School, he won a scholarship to Trinity College, Cambridge, and was placed in the first class of both parts of the Classical Tripos, graduating in 1908. Having won several prizes as an undergraduate, he competed for, and in 1909 won, a Trinity fellowship with a dissertation on the manuscript tradition of Apuleius's Apologia which he illustrated with stories from Apuleius's Metamorphoses.

The whole of Robertson's academic life, from undergraduate study to retirement, was spent in Cambridge at Trinity College. In 1911, he was appointed as an assistant lecturer in the college. During the First World War, he served as an officer in the Royal Army Service Corps, rising to the rank of major. He returned to Trinity in 1919, and lectured and supervised there until he succeeded, in 1928, A. C. Pearson as the Regius Professor of Greek. He held that chair until 1950. Between 1947 and 1951, he was vice-master of Trinity.

Robertson published his first book, A Handbook of Greek and Roman Architecture, in 1929; however, the work for which he is best remembered is his text of the Metamorphoses of Apuleius, published in the Budé series in three volumes between 1940 and 1945.

Robertson was elected a Fellow of the British Academy in 1940. He received honorary degrees from the universities of Durham, Glasgow, and Athens. He died in Cambridge, aged 76, on 5 October 1961.

== Family ==
Robertson and his first wife, Petica Coursolles, née Jones, married in 1909. They were the parents of Charles Martin Robertson, an eminent scholar of Greek vase painting, and Giles Henry Robertson, Professor of Fine Art at the University of Edinburgh. Petica Robertson, an air-raid warden, was killed by a German bomb on 24 February 1941, the only person to die from bombing in Cambridge during the Second World War. Robertson remarried in 1956, to Margaret Ann Carey, the widow of his Trinity colleague George Carey.

His sister Agnes Arber, a botanist, was the first female life scientist to become a Fellow of the Royal Society. (Note: Packer, Kathryn (23 September 2004). "Arber [née Robertson], Agnes". Oxford Dictionary of National Biography (online ed.). Oxford University Press. doi:10.1093/ref:odnb/30427. (Subscription, Wikipedia Library access or UK public library membership required.)) Of his other two sisters, one, Janet, was a painter, while the other, Margaret Hills, became a suffragist organiser and the first woman to sit on Stroud Urban District Council.

Academic offices
Preceded by Alfred Chilton Pearson	Regius Professor of Greek Cambridge University; 1928 - 1950	Succeeded by Denys Page
