= Council of India =

Council of the Secretary of State for India, 1858–1935

The Council of India (1858 – 1935) was an advisory body to the Secretary of State for India, established in 1858 by the Government of India Act 1858. It was based in London and initially consisted of 15 members. The Council of India was dissolved in 1935 by the Government of India Act 1935. It is different from the Viceroy's Executive Council based in India, which was the advisory body and cabinet of the Governor-General of India/Viceroy, which was originally established in 1773 as the Council of Four.

== History ==
In 1858 the company's involvement in India's government was transferred by the Government of India Act 1858 to the British government. The act created a new governmental department in London, the India Office, headed by the cabinet-ranking Secretary of State for India, who was in turn to be advised by a new Council of India (also based in London).

This new council of India, which assisted the Secretary of State for India contained 15 members.

The Council of the Secretary of State, also known as the India Council, was based in Whitehall. In 1907, two Indians, Sir Krishna Govinda Gupta and Nawab Syed Hussain Bilgrami, were appointed by Lord Morley as members of the council. Bilgrami retired early in 1910 owing to ill-health and his place was taken by Mirza Abbas Ali Baig. Other members included Raja Sir Daljit Singh (1915–1917), C. Rajagopalachari (1923–1925), Malik Khizar Hayat Tiwana (1924–1934) and Sir Abdul Qadir

The Secretary of State's Council of India was abolished by the Government of India Act 1935.

== Members ==
Term start	Term end	Names	Birth	Death	Notes
1888	November 1902	Right Hon. Sir Alfred Comyn Lyall, GCIE, KCB, PC	1835	1911	
1888	November 1902	Sir James Braithwaite Peile, KCSI	1833	1906	
1897	1907	General Sir John James Hood Gordon, GCB	1832	1908	
1900	March 1907	General Sir Alexander Robert Badcock, KCB, CSI	1844	1907	
November 1902		Sir Antony Patrick MacDonnell, GCSI, PC	1844	1925	Lieutenant Governor of Bengal (1893–1895); Lieutenant Governor of United Provinces (1895–1901)
November 1902	1910	Sir William Lee-Warner, GCSI	1846	1914	

== See also ==
- India Office
- English Education Act 1835
- Central Legislative Assembly
- Viceroy's Executive Council
- Council of State
- Imperial Legislative Council
- Interim Government of India
