= Arthur Shipley =

English zoologist

Sir Arthur Shipley GBE FRS
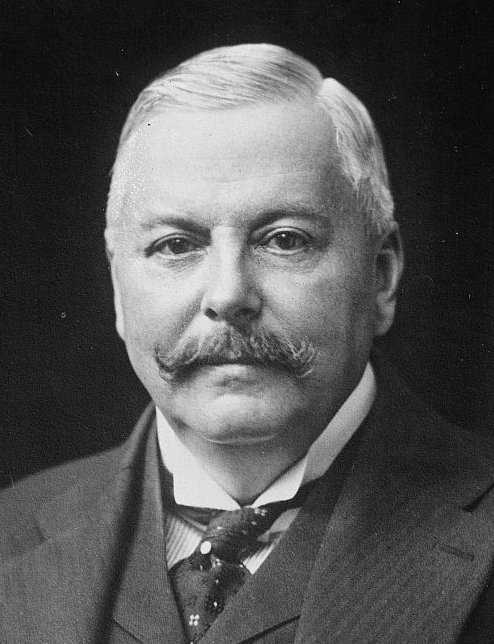

Vice-Chancellor of the University of Cambridge
- In office 1917–1919

Master of Christ's College, Cambridge
- In office 1910 – 22 September 1927

Personal details
- Born: Arthur Everett Shipley; 10 March 1861 Walton-on-Thames, Surrey, England
- Died: 22 September 1927 (aged 66)
- Education: University College School; St Bartholomew's Hospital (withdrew); Christ's College, Cambridge
- Occupation: Zoologist

Sir Arthur Everett Shipley (10 March 1861 – 22 September 1927) was an English zoologist and Vice-Chancellor of the University of Cambridge. Shipley specialised in the study of parasitic worms.

== Biography ==
Shipley was born in Walton-on-Thames, Surrey on 10 March 1861. He was brought up in Datchet, Buckinghamshire (now Berkshire), and educated at University College School. He enrolled at St Bartholomew's Hospital as a medical student in 1879, but in the following year transferred to Christ's College, Cambridge to read natural sciences, specialising in zoology.

Shipley particularly specialised in the study of parasitic worms, publishing nearly fifty papers on them and leading to his election as a Fellow of the Royal Society in 1904. He stayed at Cambridge after graduation, being appointed university demonstrator in comparative anatomy in 1886, lecturer in the advanced morphology of the Invertebrata in 1894, and reader in zoology in 1908. He was elected a fellow of Christ's College in 1887 and became college tutor in natural sciences in 1892. In 1891 he was appointed secretary to Cambridge's Museums and Lecture Rooms Syndicate, which effectively put him in charge of all university laboratories and museums. In 1910 he was elected Master of Christ's College, a post he held until his death, and from 1917 to 1919 he was Vice-Chancellor of the University of Cambridge.

In 1893, he published The Zoology of the Invertebrata, which became a popular university textbook. His Textbook of Zoology, written jointly with Ernest MacBride, appeared in 1901 and was followed by three further editions up to 1920. Between 1895 and 1909 he co-edited, with Sidney Frederic Harmer, the ten-volume Cambridge Natural History. He was co-editor, with George Nuttall, of the journal Parasitology from 1908 to 1914, and also assisted in editing the Journal of Economic Biology from 1905 to 1913. Other popular publications included: Pearls and Parasites (1908), "J": a Memoir of John Willis Clark (1913), The Minor Horrors of War (1915; about parasites), More Minor Horrors (1916), Studies in Insect Life (1917), The Voyage of a Vice-Chancellor (1919), Life (1923), Cambridge Cameos and Islands: West Indian and Aegean (1924), and Hunting under the Microscope (1928).

In 1918, Shipley was a member of the British University Mission to the United States, sent by the Foreign Office to counteract German propaganda in American universities and to promote postgraduate study by American students at British universities. In recognition of this work and other wartime services (including making the Christ's College Master's Lodge available as a convalescent home for wounded officers), Shipley was appointed Knight Grand Cross of the Order of the British Empire (GBE) in the 1920 civilian war honours.

In 1921, he was appointed to be a commissioner on a Royal Commission to advise the government on a request by the University of Dublin for financial assistance and to advise on the financial resources of the university and of Trinity College Dublin. In 1921, he was appointed to be a commissioner on a Royal Commission into the importation of livestock into the UK and the effect on the meat supply and domestic lifestock.

He was also appointed chairman of the governing body of the Imperial College of Tropical Agriculture, Trinidad, on its foundation in 1921.

He died on 22 September 1927.

== Bibliography ==
- Biography, Oxford Dictionary of National Biography
- Obituary, The Times, 23 September 1927

Academic offices
Preceded by John Peile	Master of Christ's College, Cambridge; 1910–1927	Succeeded by Norman McLean
Preceded by Thomas Cecil Fitzpatrick	Vice-Chancellor of the University of Cambridge; 1917–1918	Succeeded by Peter Giles
