= William Fraigneau =

William Fraigneau (1717–1788) was a Greek professor at Cambridge University.

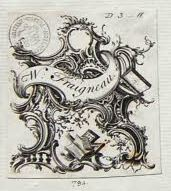
William Fraigneau, bookplate, 1784.

Fraigneau was the son of John Fraigneau, of Huguenot extraction. He was born in London in 1717, and became a Queen's Scholar at Westminster School in 1731. He proceeded to Trinity College, Cambridge, in 1736. Graduating B.A. 1739 and M.A. 1743, he took holy orders, and was elected a fellow. In 1743 he was appointed professor of Greek to the university, and held that position till 1750, when he resigned it. He then accepted the post of tutor to the family of Frederick, lord Bolingbroke, and in March 1758 was by him presented to the living of Battersea. Three years later the same patron gave him the living of Beckenham, Kent, and in 1765 a dispensation passed to enable Fraigneau to hold the two livings conjointly.

He retained both appointments till his death in Brighton on 12 September 1788. He is described by Cole as ‘a little man of great life and vivacity.’

== Wife ==
He married, 31 March 1758, Catherine (Miss Kitty Smith) (died Brompton 1807), daughter of Robert Smith, (c. 1672–1748), merchant, a freeman of London, of Thames Street, London and Mortlake.
