= Henry Jackson (classicist) =

English writer and scholar (1839–1921)

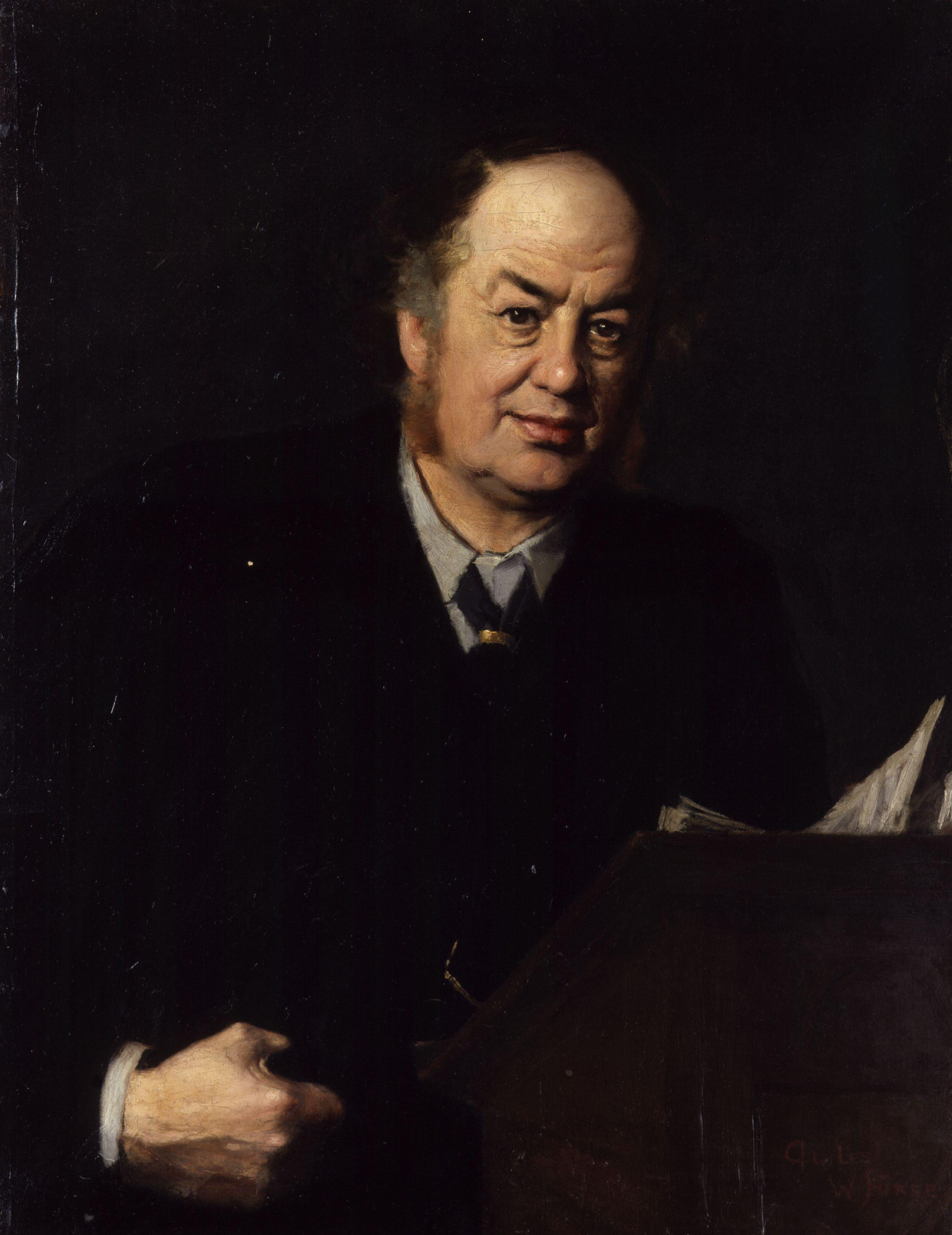
- Portrait of Henry Jackson, 1889
- Born: 12 March 1839; Sheffield, England
- Died: 25 September 1921 (aged 82); Bournemouth, England
- Occupations: Writer; scholar

Henry Jackson OM FBA (12 March 1839 – 25 September 1921) was an English writer and scholar. He served as the vice-master of Trinity College, Cambridge from 1914 to 1919, praelector in ancient philosophy from 1875 to 1906 and Regius Professor of Greek (Cambridge) at the University of Cambridge from 1906 to 1921. He was elected a Fellow of the British Academy in 1903. He was awarded the Order of Merit on 26 June 1908. From 1882 to 1892 he sat on the Council of the Senate of the University of Cambridge and was an active member of a number of the university boards. He lived within the walls of Trinity College for over 50 years. Born in Sheffield, he lived mainly in Cambridge, but died in Bournemouth.

== Biography ==
Born on 12 March 1839 in Sheffield, the son of an eminent Sheffield surgeon of the same name and his wife, Frances, third daughter of James Swettenham, of Wood End, near Winksworth. He attended Sheffield Collegiate School and Cheltenham College before entering Trinity College, Cambridge, in 1858; he graduated BA in 1862 as third Classic. He joined the Cambridge Apostles in 1863. He became a fellow at Trinity College in 1864, and became Assistant Tutor in 1866, Praelector in Ancient Philosophy in 1875 and Vice-Master in 1914. In 1875, he married Margaret, daughter of the Reverend Francis Vansittart Thornton, vicar of South-Hill with Callington, Cornwall. They had two sons and three daughters.

Jackson's married life was clouded by the illness of his wife, for many years bedridden and unable to live at Cambridge; his wife spent time in a nursing home.

Together with Henry Sidgwick and others he essentially established Cambridge University's supervisory system by introducing it to the classical side at Trinity. Other disciplines and other colleges soon followed suit. He was interested in university reform including the reform of Triposes (including the Classical Triposes), the admission of women for university education, the abolition of tests, and for the general reform of university and college statutes, and voted for women's degrees. He became Regius professor of Greek at Cambridge University, a post he was appointed to in 1906, following Sir Richard Jebb; after 1879 he became one of the editors of the Journal of Philology until his death. In July 1919, Jackson was honoured on the occasion of his eightieth birthday and his retirement as Vice-Master of Trinity College, with an address presented by the Master and Fellows.

Jackson's area of study was Greek philosophy, but he did not publish greatly – editing book 5 of the Nicomachean Ethics and writing a series of pieces on Plato's later theory of ideas in the Journal of Philology. His important work was in translating and commenting upon Aristotle's Ethics. His favourite author was William Makepeace Thackeray and, long before his death, it was said he had read Thackeray's Henry Esmond forty times apparently.

His greater achievement was in his lectures and his ability to train the next generation of classical scholars. His more eminent students included R. K. Gaye, Francis Cornford and R. G. Bury. He was a founder member of Cambridge University Liberal Club in 1886, ultimately serving as its President from 1897 to 1899.

Henry Jackson died at Bournemouth on 25 September 1921, having been a great reformer, both within his college and the university. His funeral service took place at Trinity College Chapel on 28 September 1921 which many of his colleagues and friends attended.

He is buried at the Parish of the Ascension Burial Ground in Cambridge, where his predecessor as Regius Professor of Greek, Sir Richard Claverhouse Jebb, a fellow member of the Order of Merit, is also buried.

He was a Member of the Cambridge Apostles, the intellectual secret society, from 1863; on 19 February 1898, the Cambridge Apostles had a gala meeting, with a paper delivered by Henry Jackson as one of its oldest members, who had been elected thirty-five years earlier (1863). A full dozen, Desmond MacCarthy, J.M.E. McTaggart, Frederic William Maitland (who had himself been an Apostle for twenty-five years: 1873), Nathaniel Wedd, Bertrand Russell, Robin John Grote Mayor, G.E. Moore, G.M. Trevelyan, Austin Edward Smyth, and both Llewelyn Davies brothers met that night, and Henry Jackson read on ‘Shall we write and re-write and re-write again?’

There is an article on Jackson in Proceedings of the Cambridge Philological Society suppl. vol. 28 (Cambridge 2005), 87–110. It is in a special volume entitled The Owl of Minerva: The Cambridge Praelections of 1906.

== Recognition ==
Jackson received the honorary Doctor of Laws (LL.D) from the University of Glasgow in June 1901.

In Attractive and Nonsensical Classics: Oxford, Cambridge and elsewhere by Christopher Stray, Stray says "Then there were the joint dining clubs like the Ad Eundem and the Arcades, set up to link members of the two universities. Finally, some men moved from one place to the other, like the archaeologist Percy Gardner, who went from a Cambridge to an Oxford chair. All these mechanisms facilitated mutual learning – as did the railway line. Henry Jackson, who succeeded Richard Jebb as professor of Greek at Cambridge in 1906, belonged to the Ad Eundem club. In 1913 he responded to a comment from a friend that Gilbert Murray was a "very attractive person" by saying that "Oxford is very successful in breeding 'attractive' scholars: more so than Cambridge. And this is not surprising. For we dare not talk our shop in a mixed company, and even in a scholars' party we are very conscious of our limitations as specialists." Henry Jackson declared that he always regarded the Ad Eundem "as one of Henry [Sidgwick]'s good works", and claimed that it has been very useful as a link between Oxford and Cambridge Universities.

== Books by Henry Jackson ==
He published a series of articles on "Plato's Later Theory of Ideas" (Journal of Philology); also About Edwin Drood (1911), The Fifth Book of Nicomachean Ethics of Aristotle (1879), and Texts to illustrate a Course of Elementary Lectures on the History of Greek Philosophy from Thales to Aristotle (1901).

Academic offices
Preceded by Richard Claverhouse Jebb	Regius Professor of Greek Cambridge University; 1906–1921	Succeeded by Alfred Chilton Pearson
