= James Peile (administrator) =

British administrator (1833–1906)

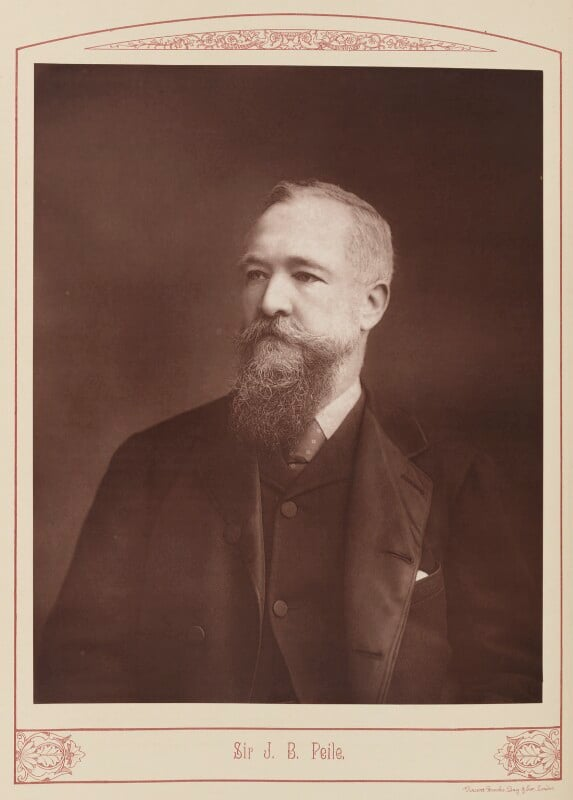
Peile, c. 1889

Sir James Braithwaite Peile (27 April 1833 – 25 April 1906) was a British administrator during the British Raj, who served as the acting Governor of Bombay in March 1885.

== Life ==
Born in Liverpool, Peile was educated at Repton School, where his father, Thomas Braithwaite Peile, was headmaster, and then went up to Oriel College, Oxford. He was appointed to the Bombay civil service in 1855. He held a number of positions over the following thirty years, including municipal commissioner of Bombay, political agent in Kathiawar, and vice-chancellor of Bombay University. He was offered, but declined, the position of commissioner of Sind. After a career mostly spent in Bombay, he retired in 1887 and was appointed to the Council of India, a position he held for a further fifteen years.

Politically, he supported increased devolution of powers to the Indian provinces and a limited increase in Indian participation in the civil service.

His son, James Peile, became a clergyman, later Archdeacon of Warwick and Archdeacon of Worcester. His first cousin was the philologist John Peile.
