= Robert Crichton =

Robert Crichton may refer to:

- Robert Crichton (bishop) (died 1585), Scottish Catholic cleric
- Robert Crichton (Lord Advocate) (1530–1582), Lord Advocate of Scotland
- Robert Crichton, 6th Lord Crichton of Sanquhar (died 1561)
- Robert Crichton, 8th Lord Crichton of Sanquhar (died 1612), son of Edward, Lord Sanquhar
- Robert Crichton (novelist) (1925–1993), American novelist
- Robert Crichton (rugby union) (1897–1940), Irish rugby union player
- Robert Crichton (comics), a supporting character in DC Comics

== See also ==
- Robert Creighton (disambiguation)
- For the Lords Crichton of Sanquhar see Earl of Dumfries
