= Benjamin Pulleyn =

Tutor of Isaac Newton

Benjamin Pulleyn (/ˈpʊlɪn/; died 1690) was the Cambridge tutor of Isaac Newton. Pulleyn served as Regius Professor of Greek from 1674 to 1686. He was known as a "pupil monger", meaning one who increased his income by accepting additional students.

Pulleyn was admitted as a sizar to Trinity College, Cambridge in 1650, became a scholar there in 1651 and graduated BA in 1653–4, MA in 1657. He became a Fellow of Trinity in 1656. Appointed Regius Professor of Greek in 1674, he became Rector of Southoe on his retirement from the chair in 1686.
