= Margaret Hills =

British politician, suffragist and feminist

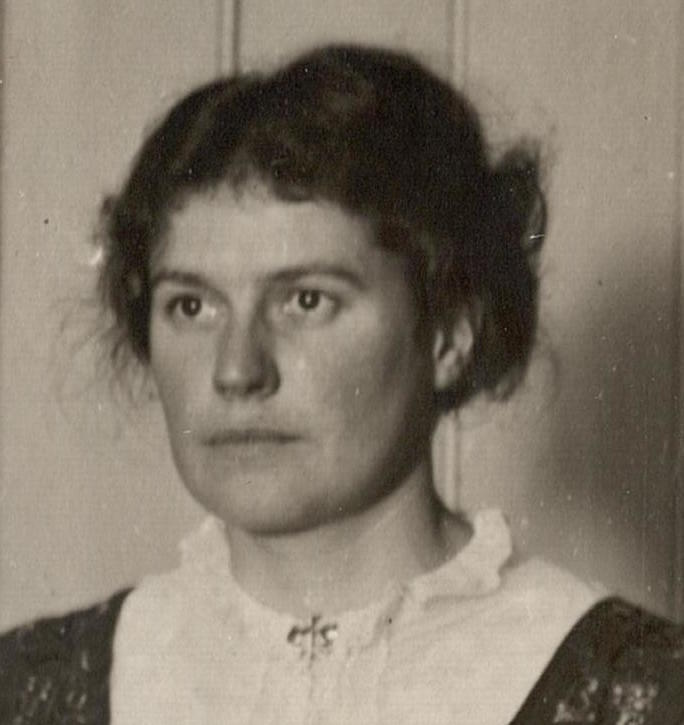
- 1909 Photograph

Organiser (National Union of Women's Suffrage Societies)
- In office 1908–1910
- In office 1911–1913

Councillor (Stroud District Council)
- In office 1928–1936

Councillor (Gloucestershire County Council)
- In office 1937–1952

Personal details
- Born: Margaret Robertson; 1882 St Pancras, London, England
- Died: 1967 (aged 84–85)
- Relatives: Agnes Arber (sister); Donald Struan Robertson (brother); Janet Robertson (sister)

Margaret Hills (née Robertson 1882 – 1967) was a British teacher, suffragist organiser, feminist and socialist. She was the first female councillor on Stroud Urban District Council and later served as a Councillor on Gloucestershire County Council.

== Early life ==
Margaret Robertson was born at 41 Fitzroy Road, Primrose Hill, London on 1 March 1882. Her father, Henry Robert Robertson, was an artist of Scottish extraction and her mother, Agnes Lucy Turner, was a descendant of Robert Chamberlain, who founded the china works of Chamberlain & Son at Worcester (which later became Royal Worcester), and her mother's relatives included John Davidson (traveller), the African explorer, and George Fownes, both of whom were Fellows of the Royal Society. Her paternal grandfather had a private school in Slough.

Her siblings were botanist Agnes Arber, classicist Donald Struan Robertson and portrait artist Janet Robertson. She is the great-aunt of musician Thomas Dolby.

Hills attended North London Collegiate School (founded by Frances Buss) and obtained an open scholarship in 1901 to attend Somerville College, Oxford and obtained first class honours in 1904 (at a time when women were not awarded degrees by the University). She was later awarded a Bachelor of Arts by Trinity College Dublin in 1906, in common with many other Oxbridge Women as neither University awarded women degrees

She attended the Cambridge Training College for Women from 1904 -1905 and obtained a Teacher Training Certificate and joined the staff of the Queen Elizabeth Grammar School for Girls, Mansfield and left the school at Christmas 1907 to seek a teaching post in London, however, "she finally decided to give up teaching for the present and work for the cause[ Women's Suffrage]"

== Suffragist organiser ==
The first recorded occasion of Margaret being involved in Women's Suffrage was as a floor speaker at a Women's Suffrage meeting in St Augustine's Hall, Highgate, London in February 1908. It is likely that she was already working for NUWSS as, the following month she worked on campaigns at both the Hastings and Peckham by-elections and wrote an article in Women's Franchise on the NUWSS policy concerning By-elections. The July 1908 Masthead of the NUWSS pages within Women's Franchise lists Margaret as an NUWSS Organiser. Later in the year the NUWSS could proudly announce that it employed three permanent organisers, including Margaret

She was appointed as Organiser for the North of England Society for Women's Suffrage in May 1909 By1911 this had become the Manchester and District Federation of Women's Suffrage Societies and she described herself as Organising Secretary in the 1911 census. In December 1912 she was appointed the organiser of the National Union of Women's Suffrage Societies Election Fighting Fund.

She was an organiser and speaker in various key public debates about women's suffrage, including a debate at the Royal Albert Hall in November 1912, and in the Co-operative Hall, Burnley in 1910.

Hills lobbied both the nascent Labour Party and the Miner's Federation, including Robert Brown, Provost of Dalkeith and Secretary of the Scottish Miners Federation, who was fielded as the first Labour Party candidate to contest the seat in the 1912 Midlothian by-election.

== Peace activities ==
Hills was a pacifist and opposed the First World War. In 1915 the Women's International League for Peace and Freedom held a summit in the Hague. She was organising secretary to the original British organising committee and responsible for negotiating the supply of passports for attendees with the Government (at that time passports were issued on a single trip basis). She was also a member of the Executive Committee of the Movement for Democratic Control

== As an elected representative ==
In April 1928, Hills was elected to Stroud Urban District Council. She is credited with driving through housing improvements including Stroud's first slum clearance scheme at Middle Hill, off Bisley Old-Road, Stroud.

In 1937 Hills was elected to Gloucestershire County Council, where she remained as a councillor until 1952. She served on the education committee after she ceased to be a councillor. Her work is remembered in the name of a housing estate in the town.

== Personal life ==
Hills met her future husband, Harold Hills, in 1913, whilst holidaying at Pella, Italy where they were introduced by mutual friend Fenner Brockway. A few days after they met they swam a mile across Lake Orta and announced their engagement two months later. On 6 August 1914, two days after the First World War broke out, they were married at Hampstead. Fenner Brockway states "I congratulated Harold on marrying Margaret, but I have never forgiven him for taking her out of politics." On the same evening they were married, Harold, a reservist doctor in the RAMC, reported for duty at Aldershot with the 4th Field Ambulance and landed in France on 16 August with the Expeditionary Force. He was reported missing with eight other doctors from the Field Ambulance, it was later reported that he had been taken prisoner of war but was part of British/German prisoner exchange of medics on 1 July 1915.

Harold Hills had trained as a doctor before the War and was employed at Long Grove Hospital, Epsom which was a London County Council mental hospital, to which he returned to after the war for a time. His time with the 4th Army included giving expert evidence in courts-martial concerning soldiers facing charges of desertion.

In 1922 they moved to Stroud, where Harold took over the practice of Doctor Henry Hardy at 11 Rowcroft and succeeded him as Certifying Surgeon under the Factories Acts. The family took up residence at the surgery and remained there until they moved to Cotsmoor, Private Road, Rodborough (now known as Lotus Cottage). In 1954 they downsized to a smaller house in the grounds which remained the family home for the rest of their lives.

Their first child, Margaret Clare, was born on 18 February 1917 at Mossley Hill, Liverpool.
