= Talbot Rice Gallery =

Art gallery in Scotland

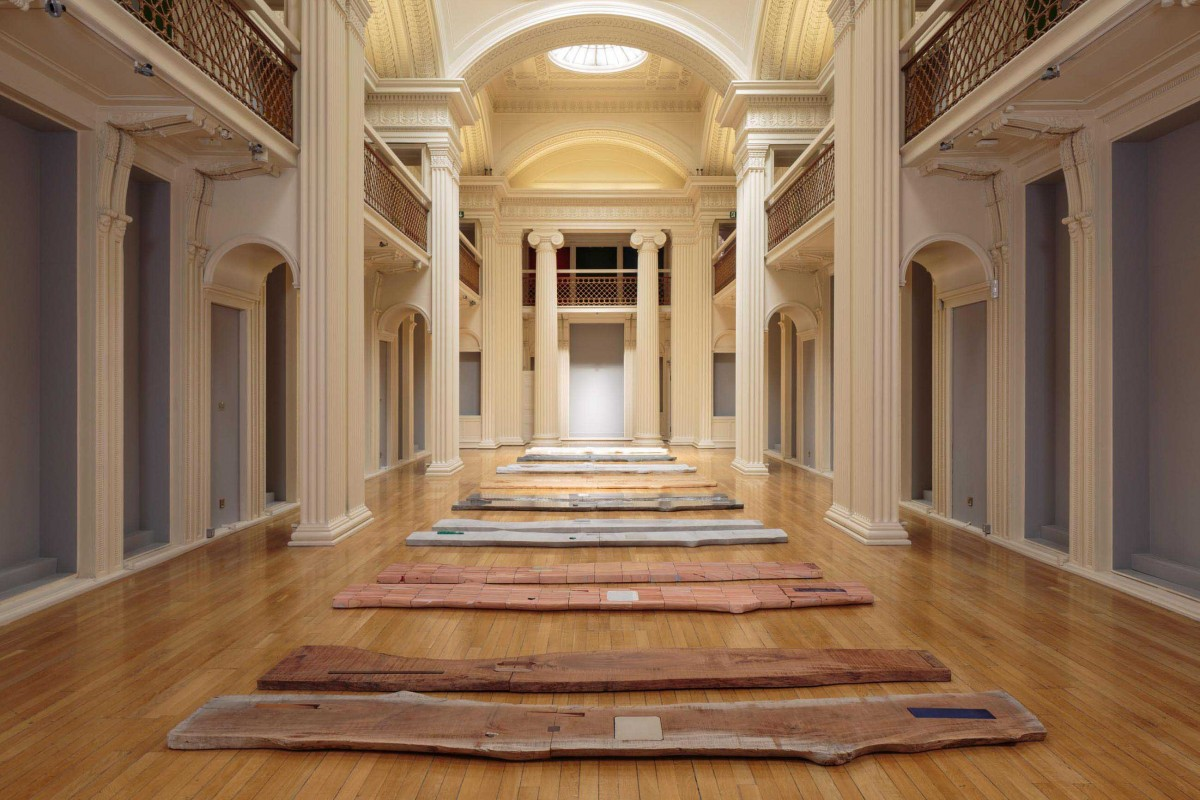

- Location within Edinburgh city centre
- Established: 1975; 51 years ago
- Location: The University of Edinburgh Old College, South Bridge, Edinburgh, EH8 9YL, Scotland, United Kingdom
- Coordinates: 55°56′50″N 3°11′16″W
- Type: Contemporary art gallery
- Director: Tessa Giblin
- Public transit access: Edinburgh Waverley
- Website: www.trg.ed.ac.uk

Listed Building – Category A
- Official name: University of Edinburgh Old College, including gates and lamp standards, South Bridge, Chambers Street, South College Street and West College Street, Edinburgh
- Designated: 14 December 1970
- Reference no.: LB27989

The Talbot Rice Gallery is the public art gallery of the University of Edinburgh in Scotland and part of Edinburgh College of Art. The building has three exhibition spaces, including a contemporary white cube gallery and a neoclassical space that was formerly a 19th-century natural history museum. Its programme includes a number of exhibitions each year, with solo shows providing international artists with access to University research and collections, whilst conceptual group shows foreground key political and social issues. The Talbot Rice Gallery is open to the public and admission is free.

== History ==
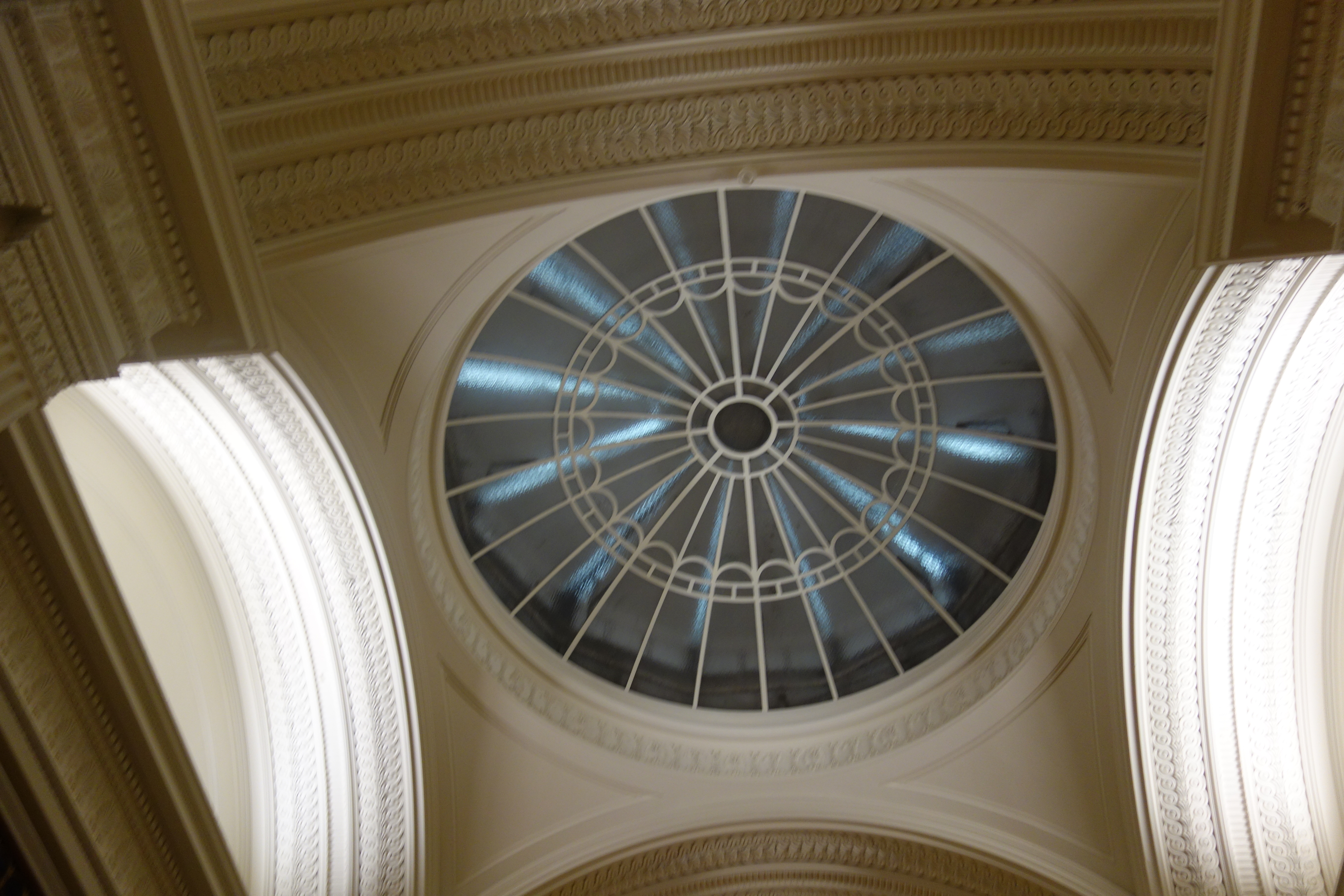
Ceiling of the Gallery

The University of Edinburgh's historic Old College was designed by Robert Adam and completed by William Henry Playfair. In 1967 the library collection was moved to a new location. An arts centre with an exhibition hall was opened in the Quad in 1970, following a £20,000 renovation paid for by the Gulbenkian Foundation. The gallery was opened in 1975 under the guidance of Prof Giles Henry Robertson and takes its name from his predecessor, Prof David Talbot Rice, the Watson Gordon Professor of Fine Art at the University of Edinburgh from 1934 to 1972.

In November 2016 the New Zealand-born curator Tessa Giblin was appointed director, succeeding Pat Fisher. Giblin had previously been curator of visual arts at the Project Arts Centre in Dublin, and was commissioner of the Irish pavilion at the 2017 Venice Biennale. Earlier curators of the gallery include the art historian Duncan Macmillan, later Professor Emeritus of the History of Scottish Art at the university.

The Gallery fundraises for their artistic programme, and has to date received support from Creative Scotland, as well as international and grant support including Mondriaan Fonds, Culture Ireland and the Freelands Foundation. In 2019, the Gallery was awarded an Arts and Humanities Research Council grant for the first time.
