= Gerald Henry Rendall =

Gerald Henry Rendall (1851–1945) was an English educator and college administrator, born at Harrow, where his father was assistant master. He was educated at Harrow and at Trinity College, Cambridge, graduating BA as 4th Classic in 1874.

He was a fellow and assistant tutor at Trinity from 1875 to 1880. He was principal of University College, Liverpool, and Gladstone Professor of Greek in 1880-97, and then the headmaster of Charterhouse School 1897-1911. From 1891 to 1895 he was also Vice-Chancellor of the Victoria University.

His most important publications were on early Christian authors writing during the Roman Empire and on their late pagan opponents such as Julian the Apostate and Marcus Aurelius.

Rendall was also an advocate of the Oxfordian theory of Shakespeare authorship, a view he propounded in a number of publications, including Personal Clues in Shakespeare Poems & Sonnets (1934) and Shakespeare: Handwriting and Spelling (1931). He became a "fervent and prolific convert" to the theory at the age of 80.

== Works ==
- Text and Commentary to Epistle of Barnabas (1877), edited by Cunningham
- The Emperor Julian, Paganism, and Christianity (1879), Hulsean prize essay for 1876
- versions of Marcus Aurelius (1897, 1901)
- Epistles to the Corinthians (1909)
- Charterhouse Sermons (1911)
- John Smith, of Harrow (1912)
- "Shakespeare Sonnets and Edward de Vere" (1930)

Academic offices
Preceded by Adolphus William Ward	Vice-Chancellor, Victoria University (UK); 1891–1895	Succeeded by Adolphus William Ward 2nd term
