= Florence Academy of Art =

American art school in Florence, Italy

Location
- Via Aretina 293, Florence; Italy
- 43.768°N 11.299°E

Information
- Established: 1991
- Website: florenceacademyofart.edu

The Florence Academy of Art is an American art school in Florence, in Tuscany in central Italy. It was started by Daniel Graves, an American painter, in 1991. Teaching is in the traditional style of the old masters. The school is a branch of the International Academy of Fine Art, and is recognised as a certificate programme by the National Association of Schools of Art and Design. The school is not listed by the Italian ministry of education, the Ministero dell'Istruzione, dell'Università e della Ricerca, among the institutions authorised to award degrees in music, dance and the arts.

The Florence Academy of Art received an excellent review from Brian T. Allen in 2021. A review in The New York Times in 2003 of a show of works by students of the school at the Hirschl and Adler gallery in Manhattan, New York, was not wholly negative, but spoke of " … inertly composed still lifes, laughable allegories and preciously romantic self-portraits ... glazed by decades of exposure to tobacco smoke".
