= Robert Creighton (1639?–1734) =

English church music composer

Robert Creighton or Creyghton (1639? – 17 February 1734) was an English churchman and composer of church music. He served as Regius Professor of Greek at the University of Cambridge during the Restoration period, and then as the precentor of Wells Cathedral.

== Early life ==
Creighton was the son of the elder Robert Creighton, a Scottish churchman. The elder Creighton served as chaplain to King Charles I during the English Civil War and then as chaplain to Charles II during his exile after the defeat of the Royalists; he then returned to England at the Stuart Restoration in 1660, becoming Dean of Wells in 1660 and Bishop of Bath and Wells in 1670. The younger Creighton was born in about 1639, and probably went into exile with his father, returning together with him at the Restoration.

== Career ==
In 1662, Creighton took the degree of M.A. at Cambridge, where he was elected fellow of Trinity College and Regius Professor of Greek.

In the entry in the Dictionary of National Biography upon which the present article is based, William Barclay Squire suggests that Creighton held the Regius Professorship for only one year starting in 1662, since in 1663 John Le Neve in the third volume of his Fasti gives the name of James Valentine as professor, though according to Edward Chamberlayne in The Present State of England Creighton was professor until 1674. However, other authorities state that Creighton held the position from 1666 to 1672, and this view is followed by Ian Spink in the 2004 edition of the Oxford Dictionary of National Biography.

From 1662 to 1667 Creighton was prebendary of Timberscombe in Wells Cathedral, and on 3 April 1667 he was appointed to the prebendal stall of Yatton in the same cathedral. On 2 January 1668 he was recommended by royal letters of Charles II for a canonry in the cathedral on a vacancy occurring, and on 2 May 1674 he was made canon, and on the same day installed as precentor. In 1678 he received the degree of D.D. at Cambridge, and in 1682 published a sermon on the "Vanity of the Dissenters' Plea for their Separation from the Church of England", which he had preached before the king at Windsor. The Examen Poeticum Duplex of 1698 also contains three Latin poems from his pen. In 1719 he gave an organ to the parish of Southover, Wells, and on two occasions gave sums to the almshouses in the same parish.

By the late 19th century, Creighton was chiefly remembered as a church musician. He was taught music at an early age, and was passionately devoted to its pursuit. Charles Burney stated that he was once a gentleman in the chapel of Charles II, but Squire (in the Dictionary of National Biography) states that this must be a mistake, unless it refers to the time when Creighton was in exile following the Civil War. He wrote a few services and anthems, which Squire regards as exceedingly good music though not very powerful nor original, and which were still frequently performed in the late nineteenth century.

== Personal life ==
Creighton was a married man, and had a family, several members of which were connected with Wells during the seventeenth and eighteenth centuries.

He died at Wells on 17 February 1734, and was buried there on 22 February.

== Attribution ==
- This article incorporates text from a publication now in the public domain: "Creighton, Robert (1639?-1734)". Dictionary of National Biography. London: Smith, Elder & Co. 1885–1900.
