= Robert Creighton (1593–1672) =

Bishop of Bath and Wells from 1670 to 1672

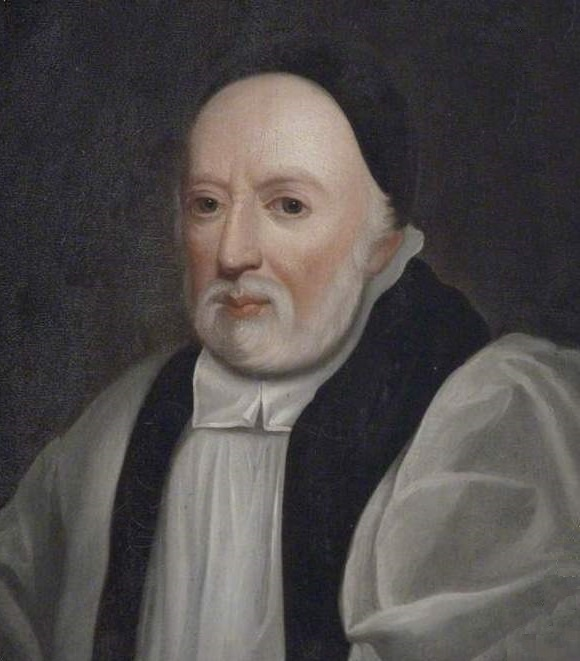
Robert Creighton, Bishop of Bath and Wells

Robert Creighton or Crichton (1593 – 21 November 1672) was a Scottish royalist churchman who became Bishop of Bath and Wells.

== Life ==
He was son of Thomas Creighton and Margaret Stuart, who claimed kinship with the ancient Lords of Ruthven, and was born at Dunkeld, Perthshire. He was educated at Westminster, and in 1613 was elected to Trinity College, Cambridge. He proceeded M.A. in 1621, and on 27 February 1622 was one of the opponents in a disputation held before the Spanish ambassador, Don Carlos Coloma.

In 1625 he was made Regius Professor of Greek, and on 27 February 1627 succeeded his friend, George Herbert, as public orator of the university, holding both these offices until 1639. In 1628 he was incorporated M.A. at Oxford. On 18 March 1631 he was installed prebendary in the cathedral of Lincoln, and on 17 December of the following year he was made canon residentiary of Wells, holding also a living in Somerset, and the treasurership of Wells Cathedral, to which he was appointed by Archbishop George Abbot during the vacancy of the see. In 1637 he held the deanery of St. Burians in Cornwall, and in 1642 was vicar of Greenwich.

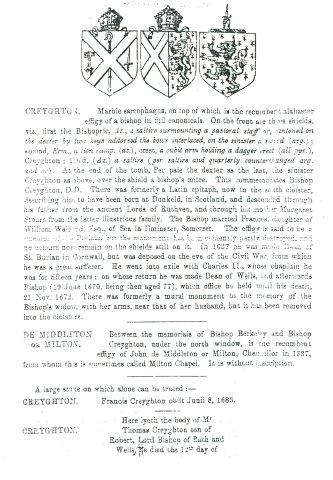
Description of Creighton's tomb at Wells Cathedral

At the outbreak of the First English Civil War he retired to Oxford, where he was made D.D. and acted as the king's chaplain, later holding the same office under Charles II. On the fall of Oxford he escaped into Cornwall in disguise and embarked for the continent. He was a member of the court of Charles II in his exile, and John Evelyn (who attests to his learning) heard him preach at St Germain on 12 August 1649, and subsequently at the Restoration at the Chapel Royal, St Paul's Cathedral and an 'extravagant' sermon given before the House of Commons on 27 April 1663 at St Margaret's, Westminster.

During his exile the king appointed him Dean of Wells. On entering on this office at the Restoration he found the deanery in the hands of Cornelius Burges, who refused to surrender it. Creighton brought a legal action of ejectment to obtain possession of it. He helped restore the cathedral from the dilapidated state into which it had fallen, partly by mischief done in 1642 and partly by neglect. On 22 June 1663 Creighton took the oaths for his naturalization in England. On 25 May 1670 he was elected bishop of Bath and Wells and consecrated 19 June following. He died on 21 November 1672, and was buried in St. John's Chapel in his cathedral. His marble tomb and effigy had been prepared by himself at great expense.

== Works ==
Creighton published Vera Historia Unionis inter Graecos et Latinos sive Concilii Florentini exactissima narratio, a translation into Latin from the Greek of Sgoropulos, the Hague, 1660, with a long preface; this was answered by the Jesuit Leo Allatius In R. Creygtoni apparatum versionem et notas, Rome, 1674 (earlier editions of both these works must have appeared), and to this Creighton made a reply, ultimately enhancing his reputation more in continental Europe than in Great Britain.

== Family ==
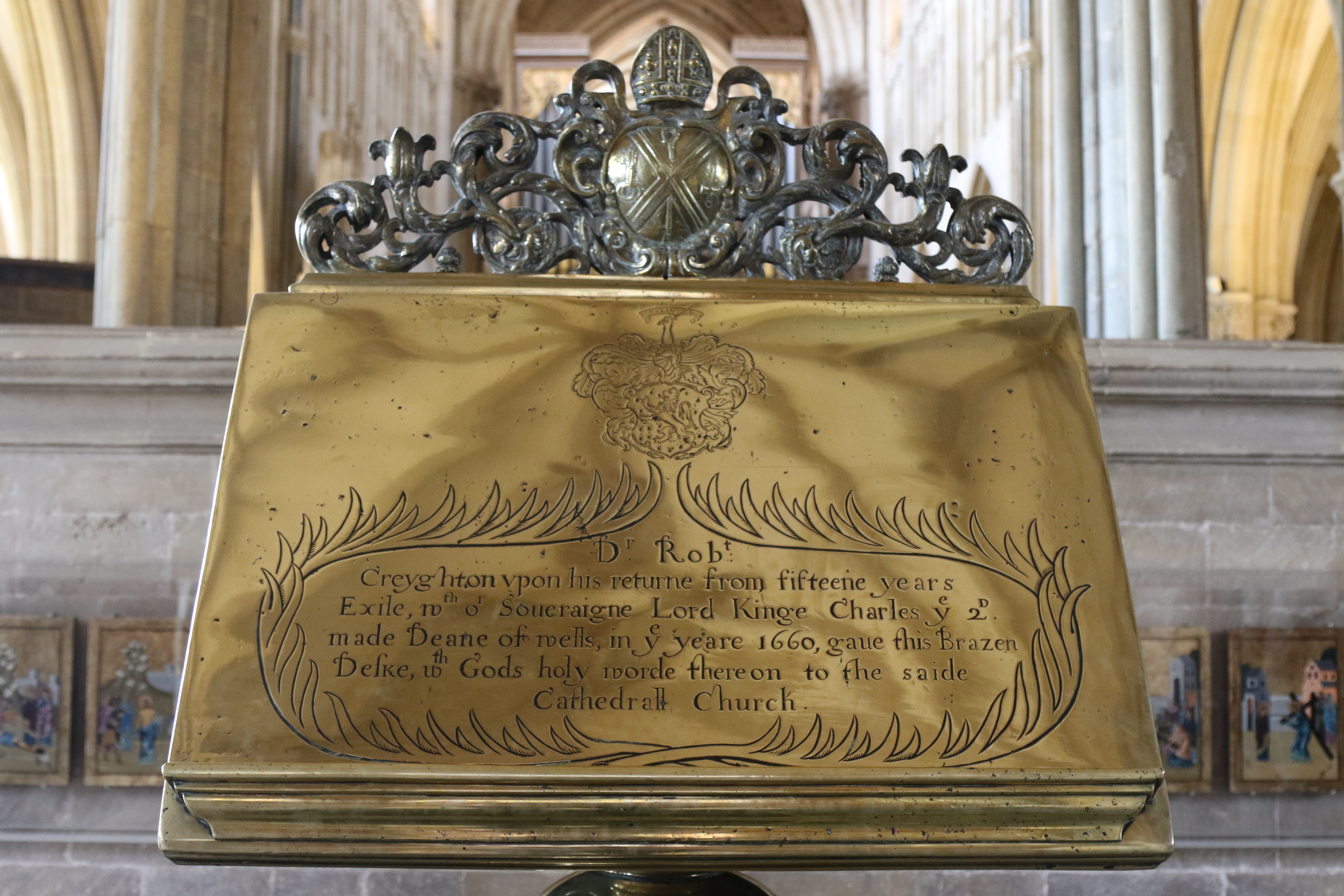
Lectern given to Wells Cathedral by Robert Creighton on his appointment as Dean of Wells in 1660

Some time after 1639, when he was still fellow of Trinity, he married Frances, daughter of William Walrond, who survived until 30 October 1683. By her he had a son also named Robert Creighton, who was also a court preacher (less effective than his father according to Evelyn) and like his father served as Regius Professor of Greek at Cambridge. The younger Creighton was also notable as a composer of church music.

== Notes ==
Church of England titles
Preceded by Walter Ralegh	Dean of Wells; 1660–1670	Succeeded by Ralph Bathurst
Preceded by William Piers	Bishop of Bath and Wells; 1670–1672	Succeeded by Peter Mews
