= A. Y. Campbell =

British classical scholar, translator, and poet

Archibald Young Campbell (1885–1958) was a British classical scholar, translator, and published poet of the 1920s and 1930s.

== Life ==
Campbell was born at Blantyre, near Hamilton, Lanarkshire, Scotland in 1885, and received his education at Hamilton Academy and Fettes College, in Edinburgh.

In 1904 he went up to St John's College, Cambridge, receiving a Bachelor of Arts degree in 1907. After graduation Campbell worked as a lecturer in Classics at the University of Liverpool and the University of Reading before returning to St. John's College as a fellow. In 1922 he was appointed as Gladstone Professor of Greek at the University of Liverpool, a position he held until his retirement 1950.

Campbell lived in Cambridge until his death, but taught at the University of Bristol during the year of 1954.

Campbell married, and had two daughters and one son.

== Publications ==
Campbell worked on the emendation of Horace (1924) and published this as Horace Odes and Epodes (University of Liverpool Press, 1953). In addition to publishing different editions of Horace, Campbell also worked on emending classical texts, such as Euripides and Aeschylus. The Agamemnon of Aeschylus (1936) is his emendation of the texts of Aeschylus.
