= Regius Professor of Greek (Cambridge) =

Professorship at the University of Cambridge

The Regius Professorship of Greek is one of the oldest professorships at the University of Cambridge. The Regius Professor chair was founded in 1540 by Henry VIII with a stipend of £40 per year, subsequently increased in 1848 by a canonry of Ely Cathedral.

== Regius Professors of Greek ==
- 1540: John Cheke
- 1547: Nicholas Carr
- 1549: Francisco de Enzinas, alias Dryander
- 1562: Bartholomew Dodington
- 1585: Andrew Downes
- 1625: Robert Creighton, sr.
- 1639: James Duport
- 1654: Ralph Widdrington
- 1660: Isaac Barrow
- 1663: James Valentine
- 1666: Robert Creighton, jr.
- 1672: Thomas Gale
- 1672: John North
- 1674: Benjamin Pulleyn
- 1686: Michael Payne
- 1695: Joshua Barnes
- 1712: Thomas Pilgrim
- 1726: Walter Taylor
- 1743: William Fraigneau
- 1750: Thomas Francklin
- 1759: Michael Lort
- 1771: James Lambert
- 1780: William Cooke
- 1792: Richard Porson
- 1808: James Henry Monk
- 1823: Peter Paul Dobree
- 1825: James Scholefield
- 1853: William Hepworth Thompson
- 1867: Benjamin Hall Kennedy
- 1889: Richard Claverhouse Jebb
- 1906: Henry Jackson
- 1921: Alfred Chilton Pearson
- 1928: Donald Struan Robertson
- 1950: Denys Lionel Page
- 1974: Geoffrey Stephen Kirk
- 1984: Eric Handley
- 1994: Patricia Elizabeth Easterling
- 2001: Richard Lawrence Hunter
- 2023: Tim Whitmarsh

== Official coat of arms ==
According to a grant of 1590, the office of Regius Professor of "Greke" at Cambridge has a coat of arms with the following blazon: Per chevron argent and sable, in chief the two Greek letters Alpha and Omega of the second, and in base a cicada (grasshopper) of the first, on a chief gules a lion passant guardant Or, charged on the side with the letter G sable. The crest has an owl.

Coat of arms of Regius Professor of Greek
Crest on a wreath "silver and sables," an owl argent, legs, beak, and ears or Escutcheon Per chevron argent and sable, in chief the two Greek letters Α (Alpha) and Ω (Omega) of the second, and in base a "cicado" or grasshopper of the first, on a chief gules, a lion passant guardant or, charged on the side with the letter G sable.

== Sources ==
- Concise Dictionary of National Biography
  - Cheke (to 1551), Carr, Dodington (to 1585), Downes (to 1624), Creighton (to 1639), Duport (to 1654), Widdrington, Barrow, Barnes, Fraigneau (to 1750), Francklin (to 1759), Cooke (to 1792), Dobree (to 1725)

== See also ==
- Regius Professor of Greek (Oxford)
- Regius Professor of Greek (Dublin)
