= David Talbot Rice =

British art historian (1903–1972)

David Talbot Rice CBE
- Born: 12 July 1903; Rugby, England
- Died: 12 March 1972 (aged 68); Cheltenham, England
- Occupations: Archaeologist and art historian
- Spouse: Tamara Talbot Rice

Academic background
- Education: Christ Church, Oxford University

Academic work
- Discipline: Byzantine art
- Institutions: Courtauld Institute of Art, University of Edinburgh

David Talbot Rice CBE (11 July 1903 – 12 March 1972) was an English archaeologist and art historian. He has been described variously as a "gentleman academic" and an "amateur" art historian, though such remarks are not borne out by his many achievements and a lasting legacy of scholarship in his field of study.

== Early life ==
Talbot Rice's name is sometimes written as Talbot-Rice. His parents were Charles Henry Talbot-Rice (1862–1931) and Cecily Mary Talbot-Rice (née Lloyd, 1865–1940).

Born in Rugby and brought up in Gloucestershire, Talbot Rice was educated at Eton prior to reading archaeology and anthropology at Christ Church, Oxford. At Oxford his circle of friends included Evelyn Waugh and Harold Acton as well as his future wife (Elena) Tamara Abelson (1904–1993) whom he was to marry in 1927. This group allegedly formed the original for Waugh's Brideshead Revisited. Elena was a Russian émigré, born in St. Petersburg and an art historian, writing on Byzantine and Central Asian art and other subjects as Tamara Talbot Rice. They had three children, two daughters and a son.

== Career ==
=== Oxford and The Courtauld ===
In 1925 while he was still an undergraduate Talbot Rice became a staff member at the Oxford Field Museum's archaeological excavation in Kish, Iraq. He was to use this experience by incorporating some of his findings when completing his bachelor's degree gained in 1927. Developing a passion for all things Byzantine, Talbot Rice joined the expeditions of the British Academy in Constantinople (now Istanbul) in 1927–32 and 1952–54. In 1928, for example, he visited Trebizond (now Trabzon), which would lead to his monograph on the subject being published in 1936.

Talbot-Rice's fieldwork continued with expeditions to Cyprus, Asia Minor, Iraq and Iran and his expertise in the area of Islamic art was recognised when, in 1932, Samuel Courtauld endowed the Courtauld Institute at the University of London and Talbot Rice was among the first appointments, taking up a position as lecturer in Byzantine and Near Eastern Art, though it appears he had little in the way of resources at his disposal.

=== Edinburgh beckons ===
Talbot Rice's academic career took off in 1934 when, at a comparatively young age, he was appointed to the Watson Gordon Chair of Fine Art at the University of Edinburgh, a post he held until his death in 1972. In 1937 he gave the Ilchester Lecture, later published as The Beginnings of Russian Icon Painting.

=== War years ===
World War Two interrupted his academic pursuits when he was called up as head of the Near East Section of Military Intelligence (MI3b), which was responsible for Eastern Europe including Yugoslavia but excluding Russia and Scandinavia. He later transferred to the Special Operations Executive serving in North Africa and Italy with the rank of lieutenant-colonel. He was appointed Member of the British Empire in 1943.

=== Return to academic life ===
When peacetime resumed in 1945 Talbot Rice returned to his work in Edinburgh. From 1952 to 1954, he led the excavations of the Great Palace of Constantinople in Istanbul, Turkey and he was later involved in the uncovering and restoration of the Byzantine frescos in the Hagia Sophia in Trabzon. In 1958 he took responsibility for a major exhibition of Byzantine art for the Edinburgh International Festival.

As well as continuing with research, teaching and the responsibilities associated with his professorship, Talbot Rice established an innovative honours degree that included Art History and Fine Art which is still offered today.

Talbot Rice served on various national committees associated with the arts including the Arts Council of which he was a member from 1963 to 1968. He was an honorary member of the Royal Scottish Academy and a senior trustee of National Galleries Scotland.

From 1967 to 1971 Talbot Rice served as vice principal of the University of Edinburgh. He died in 1972 and was buried in the churchyard of St Andrew's, Coln Rogers.

His ambition to establish an arts centre in the university was realised posthumously in 1975 by his successor Professor Giles Henry Robertson when the Talbot Rice Gallery was founded and named after him.

== Legacy ==
Shortly after his death his wife Tamara donated his archive of photographs, including prints and slides as well as his papers to Professor Anthony Bryer at the University of Birmingham's Centre for Byzantine, Ottoman and Modern Greek Studies Studies. This archive is now placed at the Barber Institute of Fine Arts in order for it to reach a wider audience.

Photographs attributed to Talbot Rice appear in the Conway Library collection at the Courtauld Institute of Art and are currently being digitised.

== Awards and honours ==
Member of the Order of the British Empire, 1943.

Commander of the Order of the British Empire (CBE) in the 1968 Birthday Honours.

== Selected publications ==
- The Birth of Western Painting: a History of Colour, Form, and Iconography Illustrated from the Paintings of Mistra and Mount Athos, of Giotto and Duccio, and of El Greco. London, Routledge, 1930.
- The Icons of Cyprus. London, 1937.
- Byzantine Art. Oxford, Clarendon Press, 1935 (last revised edition Penguin, 1968).
- Byzantine Painting at Trebizond. London, Allen & Unwin, 1936.
- Russian Icons. London, Penguin Books, 1947.
- English Art, 871-1100. Oxford, Clarendon Press, 1952.
- The Beginnings of Christian Art. London, Hodder and Stoughton, 1957.
- The Art of Byzantium. London, Thames and Hudson, 1959.
- Byzantine Icons. London, Faber and Faber, 1959.
- Art of the Byzantine Era, 'The World of Art Library' series. London, Thames and Hudson, 1963.
- Constantinople: Byzantium - Istanbul. London: Elek Books, 1965.
- Dark Ages: the Making of European Civilization. London, Thames and Hudson, 1965.
- Islamic Art, 'The World of Art Library' series. London, Thames and Hudson, 1965.
- A Concise History of Painting: From Prehistory to the 13th Century, 'The World of Art Library' series. London, Thames and Hudson, 1967.
- Byzantine Painting: the Last Phase. New York, Dial Press, 1968.
- Icons and their Dating: a Comprehensive Study of their Chronology and Provenance. London, Thames and Hudson, 1974.
- Robertson, Charles and Henderson George, Studies in Memory of David Talbot Price 1903-1972, Edinburgh, Edinburgh University Press, 1975
