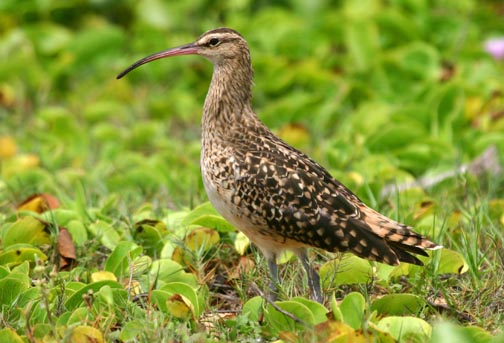

Conservation status
- Near Threatened (IUCN 3.1)

Scientific classification
- Kingdom: Animalia
- Phylum: Chordata
- Class: Aves
- Order: Charadriiformes
- Family: Scolopacidae
- Genus: Numenius
- Species: N. tahitiensis

Binomial name
- Numenius tahitiensis (Gmelin, JF, 1789)
- Breeding range

Synonyms
- Numenius femoralis

= Bristle-thighed curlew =

Species of bird

The bristle-thighed curlew (Numenius tahitiensis) is a medium-sized shorebird that breeds in Alaska and winters on tropical Pacific islands.

It is known in Mangareva as kivi or kivikivi and in Rakahanga as kihi; it is said to be the origin of the name for the New Zealand flightless bird kiwi although some linguists like Robert Blust has proposed an alternate origin from Proto-Oceanic *kiwiwi, the Pacific golden plover, instead.

== Taxonomy ==
The bristle-thighed curlew was formally described in 1789 by the German naturalist Johann Friedrich Gmelin in his revised and expanded edition of Carl Linnaeus's Systema Naturae. He placed it in the genus Scolopax and coined the binomial name Scolopax tahitiensis. Gmelin based his description on the "Otaheite curlew" that had been described in 1785 by the English ornithologist John Latham in his A General Synopsis of Birds. "Otaheite" is a former name of Tahiti. The specimen used by Latham was supplied by the naturalist Joseph Banks. Banks had accompanied James Cook on his first voyage to the south Pacific but had also received specimens from Cook's subsequent voyages. The bristle-thighed curlew is now one of nine species placed in the genus Numenius that was erected in 1760 by the French scientist Mathurin Jacques Brisson in his Ornithologie. The name Numenius is from Ancient Greek noumenios, a bird mentioned by Hesychius. It is associated with the curlews because it appears to be derived from neos, "new" and mene, "moon", referring to the crescent-shaped bill. The species is considered to be monotypic: no subspecies are recognised.

== Description ==
The bristle-thighed curlew has a long, decurved bill and bristled feathers at the base of the legs. Its length is about 40–44 cm (16–17 in) and wingspan about 84 cm (33 in) (females averaging bigger than males). The size and shape are the same as the whimbrel's, and the plumage is similar, spotted brown on their upper body with a light belly and rust-colored or buffy tail. The bigger buff spots on the upper body, unmarked light belly and barely marked flanks, tail color, and pale buffy-orange rump distinguish it from both whimbrels.

== Distribution and habitat ==
Its winter habitat is tropical Oceania, and includes Micronesia, Fiji, Tuvalu, Tonga, Hawaiian Islands, Samoa, French Polynesia and Tongareva (Penrhyn atoll). There is concern over encroachment and introduced predators in their winter habitat.

Although it was described after James Cook's visits to Tahiti in the 18th century, its breeding area was not identified until 1948. Nesting grounds are on the lower Yukon River and Seward Peninsula, with the birds preferring low-lying tundra near the shoreline. The bird is rarely seen near populated land masses, with only a handful of sightings in Canada, California and Oregon.

== Behavior and ecology ==
=== Breeding ===
Nests are built in ground depressions and lined with tundra moss. Eggs are greenish with brown spots, with four to a clutch and one brood per season. Incubation lasts around 24 days, with both parents tending the nest and protecting the newly hatched chicks.

Adults leave their chicks at about five weeks of age to migrate south. The chicks continue to feed until they are able to make the journey. The first leg of the migration includes a nonstop 4,000 km flight from Alaska to Laysan. They can make non-stop flights in excess of 6,000 km.

=== Food and feeding ===
Bristle-thighed curlews feed on a wide variety of vegetation such as flowers and berries and on insects, sea life, and other bird's eggs, which they break open with rocks—the only tool use among shorebirds.

== Gallery ==
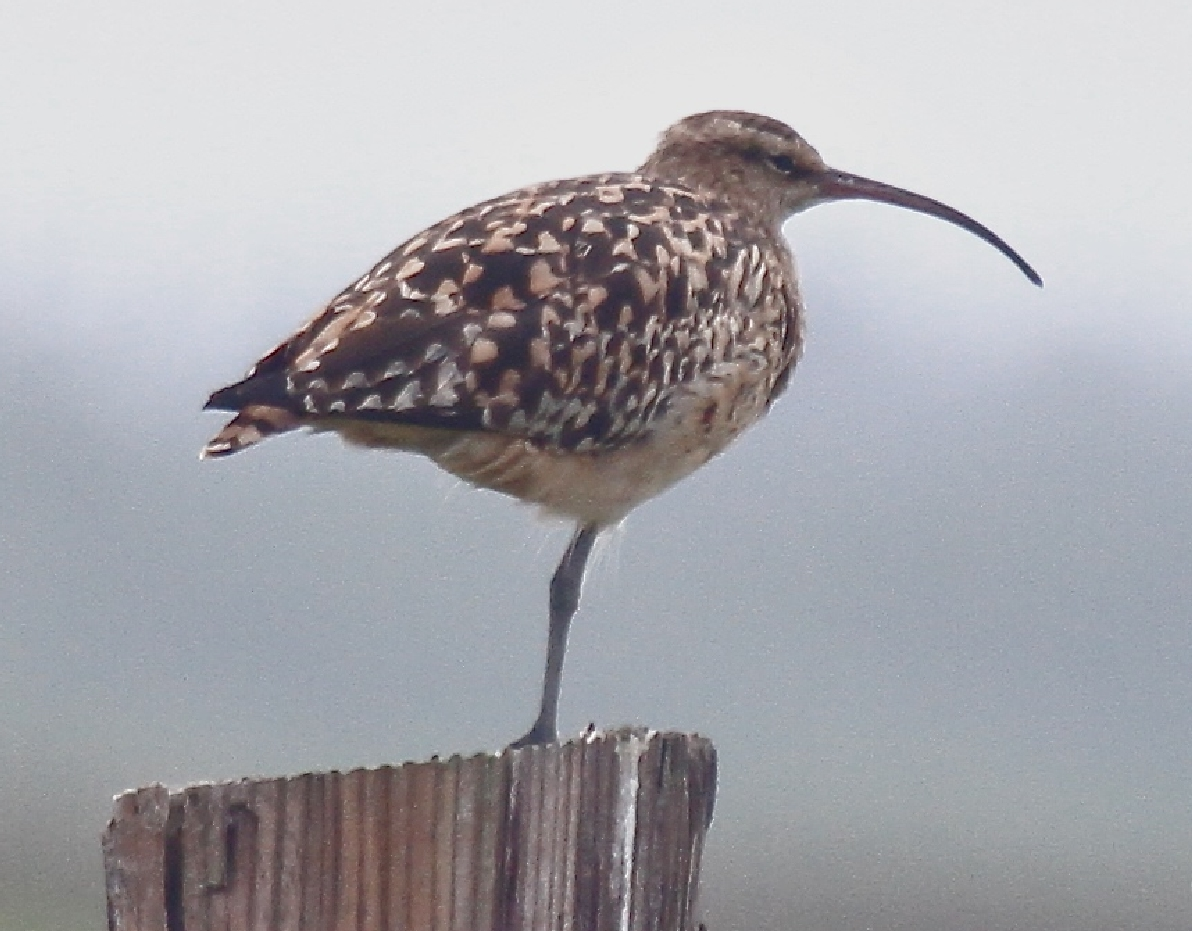
Kahuku area – O'ahu, Hawaii

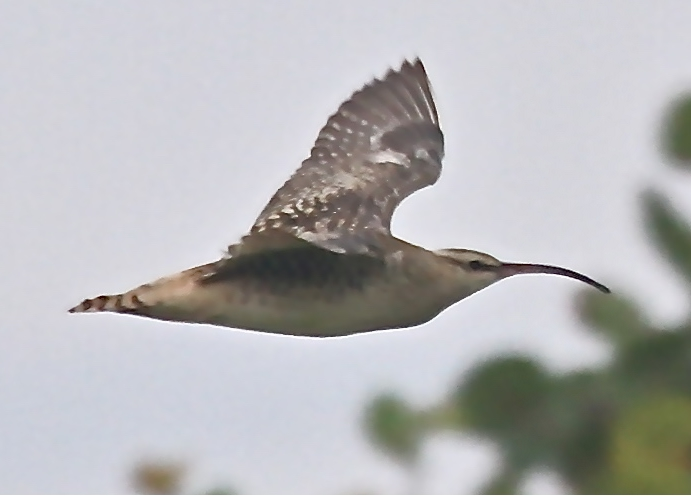
Kahuku area – O'ahu, Hawaii
