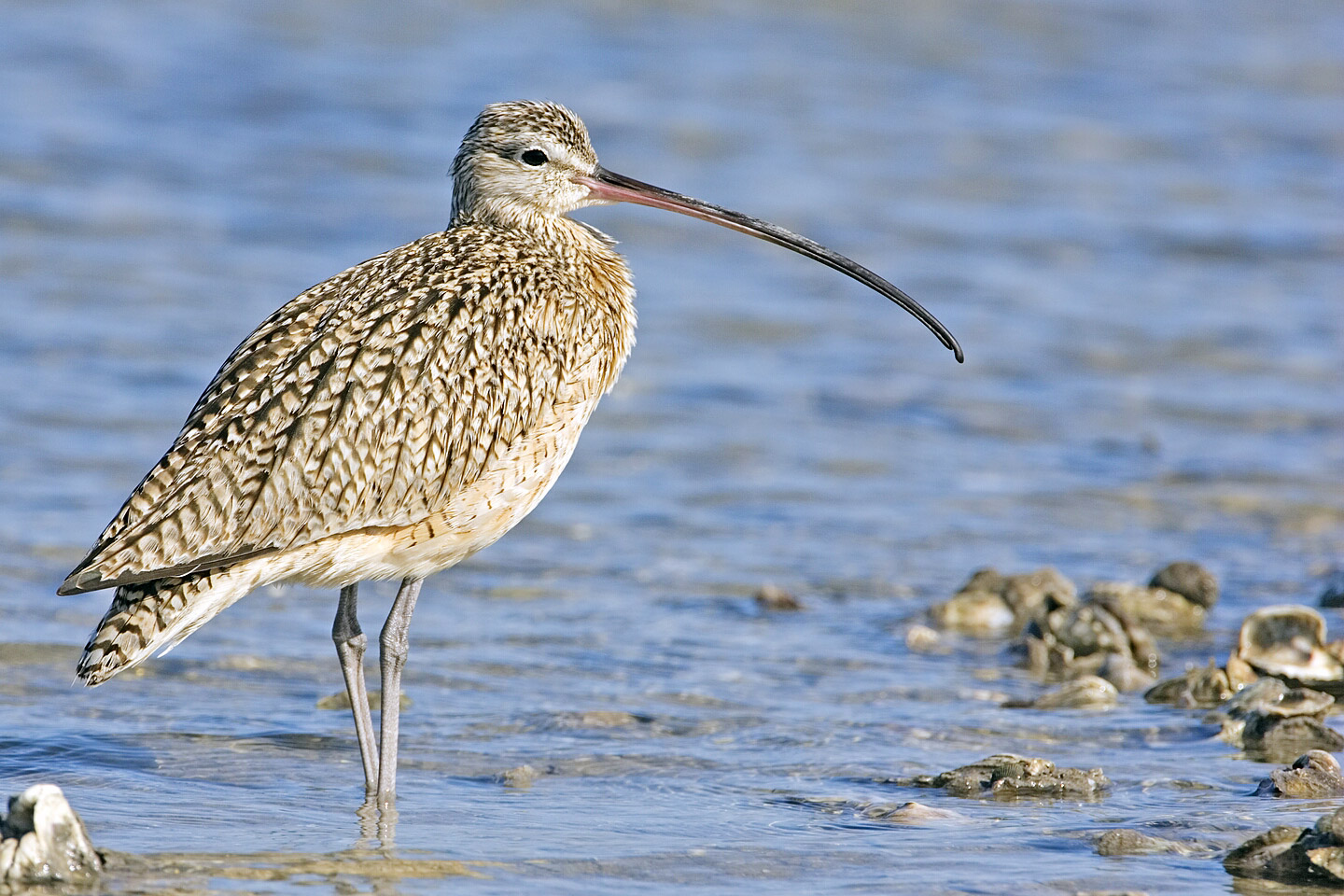
- Long-billed curlew (Numenius americanus); Fishing Pier, Goose Island State Park, Texas

Scientific classification
- Kingdom: Animalia
- Phylum: Chordata
- Class: Aves
- Order: Charadriiformes
- Family: Scolopacidae
- Genus: Numenius; Brisson, 1760

Type species
- Scolopax arquata Linnaeus, 1758

Species
- N. phaeopus N. hudsonicus †N. tenuirostris N. arquata N. americanus N. madagascariensis N. minutus †(?)N. borealis N. tahitiensis

Synonyms
- Palnumenius Miller, 1942

= Curlew =

Genus of birds

The curlews (/ˈkɜːrljuː/) are a group of nine species of birds in the genus Numenius, characterised by their long, slender, downcurved bills and mottled brown plumage. The English name is imitative of the Eurasian curlew's call, but may have been influenced by the Old French corliu, "messenger", from courir, "to run". It was first recorded in 1377 in Langland's Piers Plowman "Fissch to lyue in þe flode..Þe corlue by kynde of þe eyre". (Fish [are made] to live in the flood [water], the curlew by nature of the air.) In Europe, "curlew" usually refers to one species, the Eurasian curlew (Numenius arquata).

== Taxonomy ==
The genus Numenius was erected by the French scientist Mathurin Jacques Brisson in his Ornithologie published in 1760. The type species is the Eurasian curlew (Numenius arquata). The Swedish naturalist Carl Linnaeus had introduced the genus Numenius in the 6th edition of his Systema Naturae published in 1748, but Linnaeus dropped the genus in the important tenth edition of 1758 and put the curlews together with the woodcocks in the genus Scolopax. As the publication date of Linnaeus's sixth edition was before the 1758 starting point of the International Commission on Zoological Nomenclature, Brisson and not Linnaeus is considered as the authority for the genus. The name Numenius is from Ancient Greek noumenios, a bird mentioned by Hesychius. It is associated with the curlews because it appears to be derived from neos, "new" and mene, "moon", referring to the crescent-shaped bill. The genus now contains nine species:

The following cladogram showing the genetic relationships between the species is based on a molecular phylogenetic study published in 2023.

- Numenius
  - - Little curlew (N. minutus)
    - - Bristle-thighed curlew (N. tahitiensis)
      - - Eurasian whimbrel (N. phaeopus)
        - Hudsonian whimbrel (N. hudsonicus)
  - - - Long-billed curlew (N. americanus)
      - Eskimo curlew (N. borealis)
    - - Far Eastern curlew (N. madagascariensis)
      - - Eurasian curlew (N. arquata)
        - Slender-billed curlew (N. tenuirostris)

== Description ==
They are one of the most ancient lineages of scolopacid waders, together with the godwits which look similar but have straight bills. Curlews feed on mud or very soft ground, searching for worms and other invertebrates with their long bills. They will also take crabs and similar items.

== Distribution ==
The Eurasian curlew pictured in the coat of arms of Oulunsalo, a former municipality of North Ostrobothnia, Finland

Curlews enjoy a worldwide distribution. Most species exhibit strong migratory habits and consequently one or more species can be encountered at different times of the year in Europe, Ireland, Britain, Iberia, Iceland, Africa, Southeast Asia, Siberia, North America, South America and Australasia.

The distribution of curlews has altered considerably in the past hundred years as a result of changing agricultural practices. For instance, Eurasian curlew populations have suffered due to draining of marshes for farmland, whereas long-billed curlews have shown an increase in breeding densities around areas grazed by livestock. As of 2019, there were only a small number of Eurasian curlews still breeding in Ireland, raising concerns that the bird will become extinct in that country.

The stone-curlews are not true curlews (family Scolopacidae) but members of the family Burhinidae, which is in the same order Charadriiformes, but only distantly related within that.

For key to IUCN status below, see Conservation status.

Genus Numenius – Brisson, 1760 – nine species
| Common name | Scientific name and subspecies | Range | Size and ecology | IUCN status and estimated population |
|---|---|---|---|---|
| Eurasian whimbrel | Numenius phaeopus (Linnaeus, 1758) Five subspecies: N. p. islandicus Brehm, C.L., 1831; N. p. phaeopus (Linnaeus, 1758l); N. p. alboaxillaris Lowe, 1921; N. p. rogachevae Tomkovich, 2008; N. p. variegatus (Scopoli, 1786) | Subarctic Asia and Europe as far south as Scotland | Size: Habitat: Diet: | LC |
| Hudsonian whimbrel | Numenius hudsonicus Latham, 1790 Two subspecies: Numenius hudsonicus rufiventris – Vigors, 1829; Numenius hudsonicus hudsonicus – Latham, 1790 | Southern North America and South America. | Size: Habitat: Diet: | LC |
| Slender-billed curlew † (Last seen in 1995) | Numenius tenuirostris Vieillot, 1817 | Russia, Persian gulf, in Kuwait and Iraq | Size: Habitat: Diet: | EX |
| Eurasian curlew | Numenius arquata (Linnaeus, 1758) Three subspecies: N. a. arquata, (Linnaeus, 1758); N. a. orientalis, Brehm – 1831; N. a. suschkini, Neumann, 1929 | Temperate Europe and Asia | Size: Habitat: Diet: | NT |
| Long-billed curlew | Numenius americanus Bechstein, 1812 | Central and western North America | Size: Habitat: Diet: | LC |
| Far Eastern curlew | Numenius madagascariensis (Linnaeus, 1766) | Northeastern Asia, including Siberia to Kamchatka, and Mongolia. Coastal Australia, with a few heading to South Korea, Thailand, Philippines and New Zealand | Size: Habitat: Diet: | EN |
| Little curlew | Numenius minutus Gould, 1841 | Australasia, far north of Siberia. | Size: Habitat: Diet: | LC |
| Bristle-thighed curlew | Numenius tahitiensis (Gmelin, JF, 1789) | Tropical Oceania, and includes Micronesia, Fiji, Tuvalu, Tonga, Hawaiian Islands, Samoa, French Polynesia and Tongareva, lower Yukon River and Seward Peninsula | Size: Habitat: Diet: | NT |
| Eskimo curlew – †? (Last seen in 1987) | Numenius borealis (Forster, 1772) | Western Arctic Canada and Alaska, Pampas of Argentina | Size: Habitat: Diet: | CR |

The Late Eocene (Montmartre Formation, some 35 mya) fossil Limosa gypsorum of France was originally placed in Numenius and may in fact belong there. Apart from that, a Late Pleistocene curlew from San Josecito Cave, Mexico has been described. This fossil was initially placed in a distinct genus, Palnumenius, but was actually a chronospecies or paleosubspecies related to the long-billed curlew.

The upland sandpiper (Bartramia longicauda) is an odd bird which is the closest relative of the curlews. It is distinguished from them by its yellow legs, long tail, and shorter, less curved bill.

== Protection ==
In the UK, the Royal Society for the Protection of Birds (RSPB) has a five-year plan aimed at restoring the number of curlews in the country. The inter-agency plan was launched at the House of Lords in January 2026.
