= Constitutions (Aristotle) =

4th-century BCE monograph series

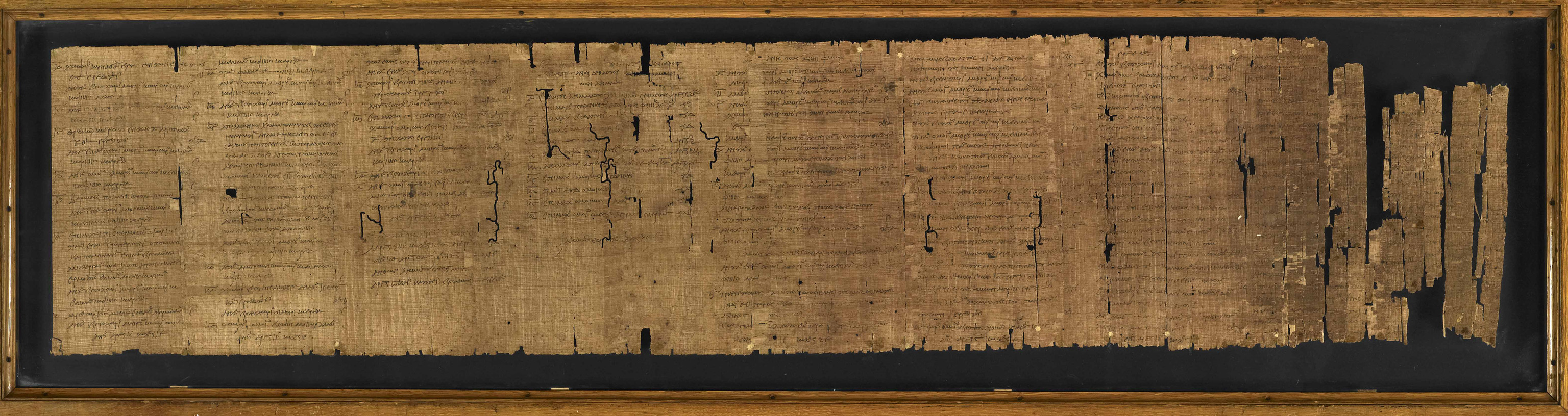
- The only surviving ancient copy, the British Library
- Author: Aristotle and/or his students
- Original title: Πολιτεῖαι
- Language: Ancient Greek
- Subject: history and system of the Greek poleis
- Published: second half of 4th century BCE
- Publication place: Athens

Constitutions, or Politeiai (Ancient Greek: Πολιτεῖαι), was a series of monographs written under the inspiration of Aristotle by his students or by Aristotle himself in the second half of the 4th century BCE. Each of the 158 parts described the history and political system of one of the Greek poleis. The only nearly completely preserved constitution is the Constitution of the Athenians.

== Inventory ==
The cycle comprised 158 descriptions of Greek poleis. This information is provided by Diogenes Laertius and Hesychius of Miletus. Later commentators (Ammonius and Elias, 6th century) gave numbers like 250 or 255 works, but this could have resulted from including works by imitators in addition to the actual Politeiai, as concluded for the first time by the commentator on Aristotle in the 6th century, Simplicius, and also from Aristotle's descriptions of the Customary Laws of Barbarians. Another explanation for this number is a transmission error – the rounded number 150 could have been changed to 250. Another, less credible number is 171, reported by Ibn Abi Usaybi'a.

The content of individual works can be inferred primarily from preserved fragments. The most reliable group of Constitutions are those described in the preserved citations as Politeia written by Aristotle. These are the systems of the following poleis: Athens, Acarnania, Akragas, Ambracia, Argos, Arcadia, Achaea, Bottiaea, Cyprus, Delphi, Delos, Aegina, Elis, Epirus, Phocis, Gela, Himera, Ithaca, Keos, Cumae, Cius, Cythnus, Colophon, Corcyra, Corinth, Cyme, Cyrene, Sparta, Leukas, Epizephyrian Locris, Miletus, Naxos, Naples, Opus, Orchomenus, Paros, Pellene, Samos, Samothrace, Sicyon, Syracuse, Taranto, Tegea, Tenedos, Thessaly.

Another group of poleis is presented in fragments where Aristotle's authorship is indicated, but without specifying a particular political system: Antandrus, Adramyttium, Chalcedon, Chalcis, Epidaurus, Crete, Crotone, Cythera, Meols, Miletus, Rhegion, Rhodes, Soloi, Sybaris, Thebes, Tenos.

Due to the preparation of the Politeia as material for the Politics, it is highly probable to expand the obtained collection with cities appearing in this work: Abydos, Amphipolis, Antissa, Apollonia Illyria, Apollonia Pontica, Aphytis, Byzantium, Chios, Eretria, Pharsalos, Phocis, Hestiaea, Heraea, Heraclea Pontica, Histria, Catania, Clazomenae, Knidos, Kos, Larissa, Leontini, Magnesia, Mantineia, Mitylene, Thira, Thurii, Zancle.

The last group of potential political systems can be created from Heracleides' list – probably an author unknown from other activities (presumably from the 4th/5th century AD), sometimes identified as Aristotle's disciple Heracleides of Pontus or Heraclides Lembus, who lived in the 2nd century BC. Probably his source was only the Constitutions and the Customary Laws of Barbarians; after excluding the latter, the list of described poleis would also include Amorgos, Argilos, Ephesus, Icaria, Cephalonia, Lepreum, Minos, and Thespiae. In total, 44 poleis were included in the list.

The individual poleis were arranged alphabetically in the collection and numbered. The first was the Athenian politeia, and the politeia of Ithaca was numbered 42. Based on descriptions in Alexandrian catalogs, Heinrich Nissen proposed the thesis that the collection could have been divided into four parts corresponding to democracy, oligarchy, tyranny, and aristocracy. However, such a division would contradict the alphabetical order, would be very unbalanced, and would cause problems with classifying changing political systems.

== Authorship and date ==
Aristotle mentioned the collection of Constitutions in the Nicomachean Ethics (10.1181B17). It was supposed to be material gathered for his work on Politics. However, after the Athenian politeia was discovered, historians noted a later dating of the monographs (in the 320s BC) compared to the Politics (after 336 BC, most likely before 331 BC). Therefore, it was concluded from the analysis of the Constitution itself that the material was initially collected in the 330s BC, while its compilation occurred after Aristotle finished his work on Politics.

The only clue allowing for dating other than the Athenian politeia (besides Aristotle's lifetime) is the mention of gold coins in the Political Constitution of Cyrene, which were introduced around 340 BC. Due to the condition of the fragments, the authorship of the Athenian politeia was primarily considered. Historians agree that it is unlikely that Aristotle wrote all 158 politeia without the involvement of his students.

Arguments supporting the joint authorship of the politeia are provided by John Keaney. According to him, the schematic form of the works facilitated the author's quick creation of new politeia, which were probably shorter than the Athenian one. Additional facilitation could have been dictating the works, indicated by certain – characteristic for Aristotle – phrases repeated in the fragments. Aristotle could have obtained the information necessary to write the political systems during his travels (before his second stay in Athens) and from his students. Aristotle's authorship is also attested by ancient sources.

== Structure and content ==
According to John Keaney, the remaining constitutions were written following the same pattern as the Athenian one. An exception could be the Political Constitution of Arcadia, as the Arcadian League was founded in the 360s BC, so it might not have had a historical section. Similarly, systematic sections might have been absent from poleis that ceased to exist. Therefore, the remaining poleis had a historical part describing successive changes in political systems and a systematic part describing the system contemporary to the author.

David Toye expressed the opinion that the Constitution of the Athenians might not be representative. He points out the significant prevalence of mythological themes in the preserved fragments, alongside the modest presence of fragments concerning historical times. This situation could be due to the tastes of the copyists in the Hellenistic period. However, based on Plutarch's opinion, the historian states that the treatises were still available at the end of the 1st century AD, indicating that they were being copied until that time. Another explanation is the overrepresentation of historical content in the Athenian politeia.

As sources for the historical part of the Constitutions, Aristotle must have relied on literary works. Relying solely on oral accounts would have provided information about events from only three or four generations ago. Additionally, there is no evidence of systematic travels by Aristotle and his students to collect materials for the cycle. From the part of Fragmente der griechischen Historiker dedicated to local history, Toye identified 27 authors whose works were likely available in 330 BC and useful for historical description. Most preserved fragments concerned heroic times. Only four historiographers could be classified as researchers of the history of individual poleis other than Athens. The rest referred more to the history of a larger area, resulting in the dominance of descriptions of the most politically significant centers – Athens, Sparta, and Syracuse, while descriptions of smaller cities were less favored. Therefore, Aristotle devoted most attention to these poleis in his Politics. The flourishing of local history occurred only in the Hellenistic period – Felix Jacoby collected more than twice as many fragments from this period (62).

With a limited resource of historiographers' works, the author of the Constitutions supplemented his cycle with information obtained from the analysis of poetry, proverbs, buildings, and individual objects. Nevertheless, in most cases, he did not have the opportunity to construct a continuous historical narrative analogous to the Constitution of the Athenians.

According to Keaney, the Constitution of the Athenians was the longest. Following it would be the politeia of Lacedaemon, and the third in terms of extent might have been the politeia of Crete. This opinion is supported by the sequence of works in Heracleides' list and the significance of these places for the political scientist.

== Reception ==
The Constitutions did not find wide resonance in ancient literature. The factual form of these works may have been a reason, as it did not appeal to enthusiasts of colorful language. Also, the political situation – the consolidation of the Greeks during the early Hellenistic period – did not favor the popularity of the histories of individual poleis. The collection was likely used by Alexandrian editors, who could refer to it when compiling biographies, curiosities, and explanations for other texts. Generally, the surviving fragments come from their commentaries. The last known individuals with access to the entire cycle of Constitutions were Heraclides and Sopatros (around 500 AD).

Aristotle did not have numerous imitators. The history of some Greek cities was compiled by his student, Dicaearchus of Messene, whose collection was among others in the hands of Cicero.

The collection of Aristotle's fragments was undertaken in the 19th century by Valentin Rose. He published them in the work Aristotelis qui ferebatur librorum fragmenta. In the 1886 edition, he gathered 223 fragments of Constitutions, of which 91 concerned Athens and 14 Sparta. Separate discoveries were made by papyri. In 1880, the Berlin Museum purchased small scrolls containing, as it later turned out, fragments of the historical part of the Constitution of the Athenians. Almost the entire Constitution of the Athenians was found on a papyrus at the British Museum. The content of P. Lond. 131 was published in 1891 by Frederic George Kenyon, and in the same year, a facsimile of the papyrus was also published.

== Bibliography ==
- Kulesza, Ryszard (2001). "Wprowadzenie". Dzieła wszystkie (in Polish). Vol. VI. Warsaw: Polish Scientific Publishers PWN. ISBN 83-01-13355-4.
- Piotrowicz, Ludwik (2001). "Wstęp". Dzieła wszystkie (in Polish). Vol. VI. Warsaw: Polish Scientific Publishers PWN. ISBN 83-01-13355-4.
- Keaney, John J. (1992). The composition of Aristotle's Athenaion Politeia. Observation and explanation. New York: Oxford University Press. ISBN 0-19-507032-1.
- Toye, David L. (1999). "Aristotle's Other Politeiai: Was the Athenaion Politeia Atypical?". The Classical Journal. 94 (3). The Classical Association of the Middle West and South, Inc. (CAMWS): 235–253. JSTOR 3298368.
- Rhodes, Peter John (2006). A commentary on the Aristotelian Athenaion politeia. Oxford: Oxford University Press. ISBN 9780198149422.
