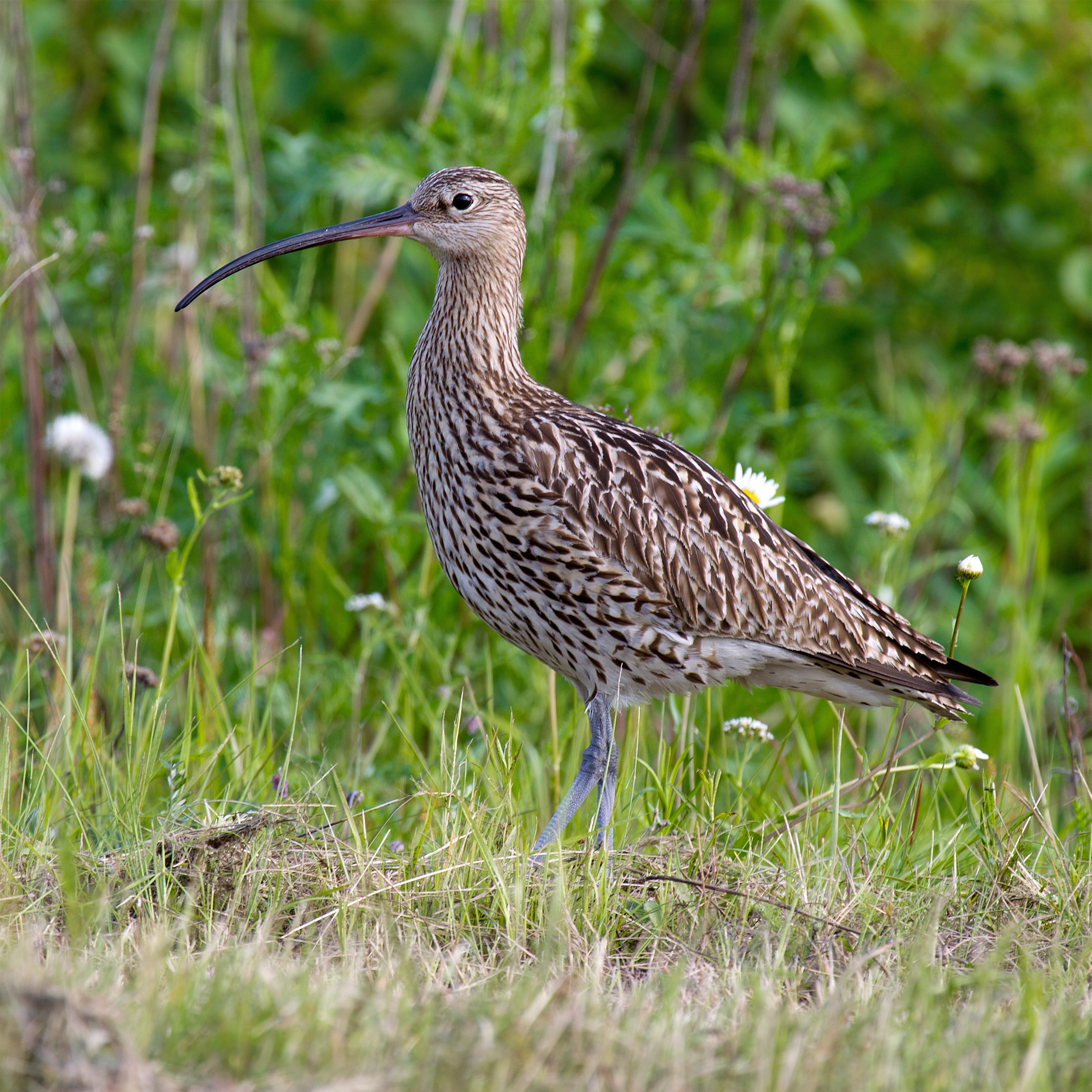
- A male Eurasian curlew

Conservation status
- Near Threatened (IUCN 3.1)

Scientific classification
- Kingdom: Animalia
- Phylum: Chordata
- Class: Aves
- Order: Charadriiformes
- Family: Scolopacidae
- Genus: Numenius
- Species: N. arquata

Binomial name
- Numenius arquata (Linnaeus, 1758)
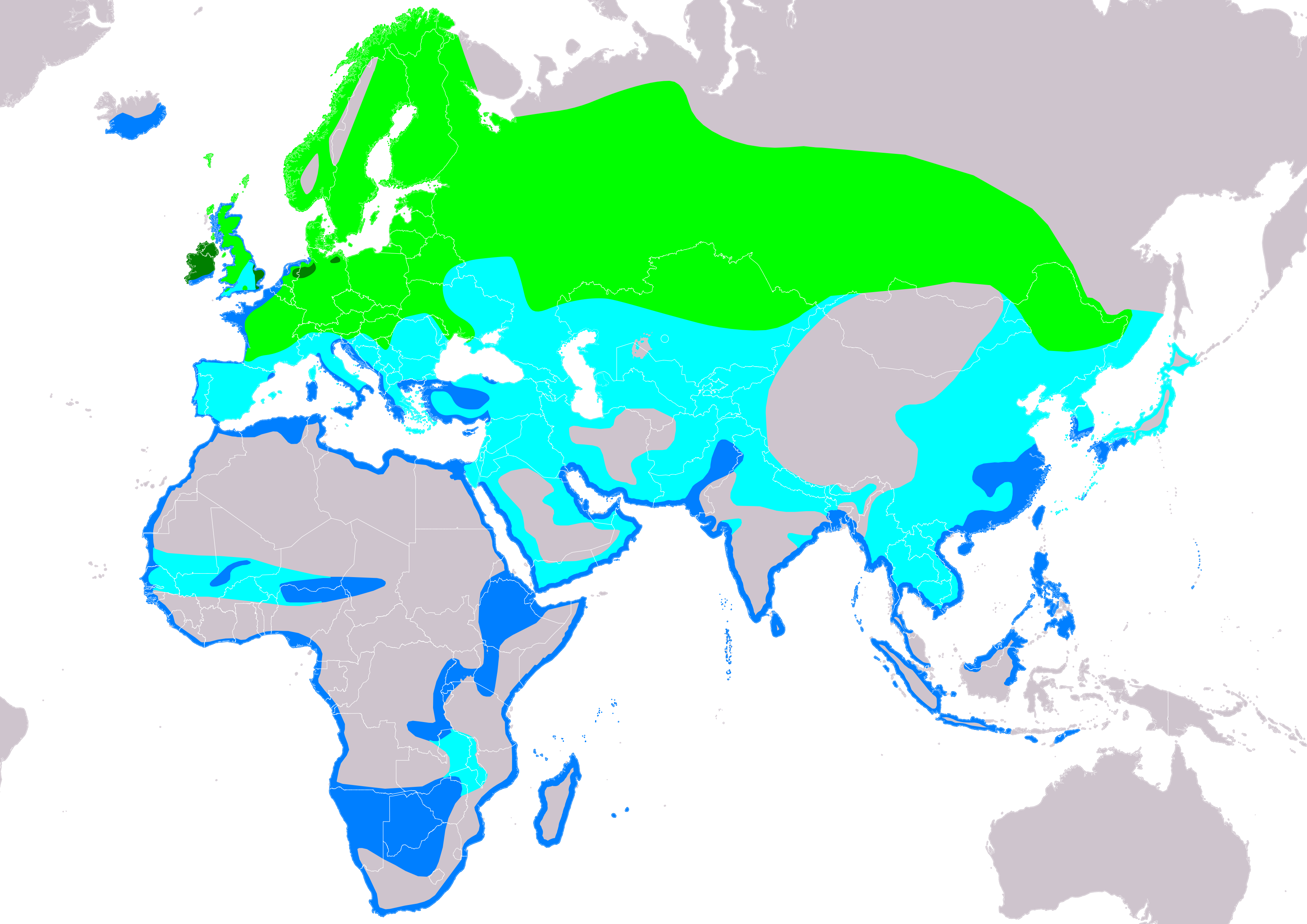
- Global map of N. arquata Year-round range Summer range Passage Winter range

Synonyms
- Scolopax arquata Linnaeus, 1758

Audio
- Song

= Eurasian curlew =

Species of bird

The Eurasian curlew or common curlew (Numenius arquata) is a very large wader in the family Scolopacidae. It is one of the most widespread of the curlews, breeding across temperate Europe and Asia. In Europe, this species is often referred to just as the "curlew", and in Scotland known as the "whaup" in Scots.

== Taxonomy ==
The Eurasian curlew was formally described by the Swedish naturalist Carl Linnaeus in 1758 in the tenth edition of his Systema Naturae under the binomial name Scolopax arquata. It is now placed with eight other curlews in the genus Numenius that was introduced by the French ornithologist Mathurin Jacques Brisson in 1760. The genus name Numenius is from Ancient Greek νουμήνιος, noumēnios, a bird mentioned by Hesychius. It is associated with the curlew because it appears to be derived from neos, "new" and mene "moon", referring to the crescent-shaped bill. The species name arquata is the Medieval Latin name for this bird, derived from Latin arcuatus, "bow-shaped", and again referring to the shape of the bill.

The English name "curlew" is imitative of the Eurasian curlew's call, but may have been influenced by the Old French corliu, "messenger", from courir, "to run". It was first recorded in 1377 in Langland's Piers Plowman "Fissch to lyue in þe flode..Þe corlue by kynde of þe eyre".

Three subspecies are recognised:

- Numenius arquata arquata, (Linnaeus, 1758) – breeds in west, north and central Europe
- Numenius arquata orientalis, Brehm – 1831 – breeds in west and central Siberia through to Northeast China
- Numenius arquata suschkini, Neumann, 1929 – breeds from western Kazakhstan to southwestern Siberia

== Description ==
The Eurasian curlew is the largest wading bird in its range. It is 50–60 cm (20–24 in) long, has a wingspan of 89–106 cm (35–42 in) wingspan and weighs 410–1,360 g (0.90–3.00 lb). It is mainly greyish brown, with a white back, greyish-blue legs and a very long curved bill. Males and females look identical, but the bill is longest in the adult female. It is generally not possible to determine the sex of an individual Eurasian curlew, or even of several, as there is much variation. However, it is usually possible to tell the sexes apart in a mated pair. The familiar call is a loud curloo-oo.

The only other species similar to the curlew is the Eurasian whimbrel (Numenius phaeopus). The whimbrel is smaller and has a shorter bill with a kink rather than a smooth curve. Curlews in winter plumage may also resemble bar-tailed godwits (Limosa lapponica) in flight; however, the latter have a smaller body, a slightly upturned beak, and legs that do not extend beyond their tail tips. The Eurasian curlew's feet are longer, forming a conspicuous "point".

== Distribution and habitat ==
The curlew is a migratory species over most of its range, wintering in Africa, southern Europe and southern Asia. Occasionally, however, a vagrant individual reaches places far from its normal range, such as Nova Scotia and the Marianas. It is present all year round in areas with milder climates, such as Ireland and the United Kingdom, as well as on the adjacent European coasts.

The reclamation and drainage of marshy fields and moorland, as well as the afforestation of the latter, has led to local decreases. In contrast, the conversion of forest to grassland in some parts of Scandinavia has led to increases there.

== Behaviour and ecology ==
The Eurasian curlew is generally wary. It is highly gregarious outside the breeding season.

The oldest recorded is a female 33 years and 8–9 months old, ringed on Brownsea Island in 1992 and breeding in the New Forest, seen still alive at the start of March 2026.

=== Breeding ===
The nest is a bare scrape in a meadow or similar habitat. Curlews lay four eggs in April or May, and both adults incubate them for four weeks until they begin to hatch. Curlews tend to nest close to common kestrel nests as these can offer protection from other predators, such as corvids, even though kestrels also prey on curlew nests.

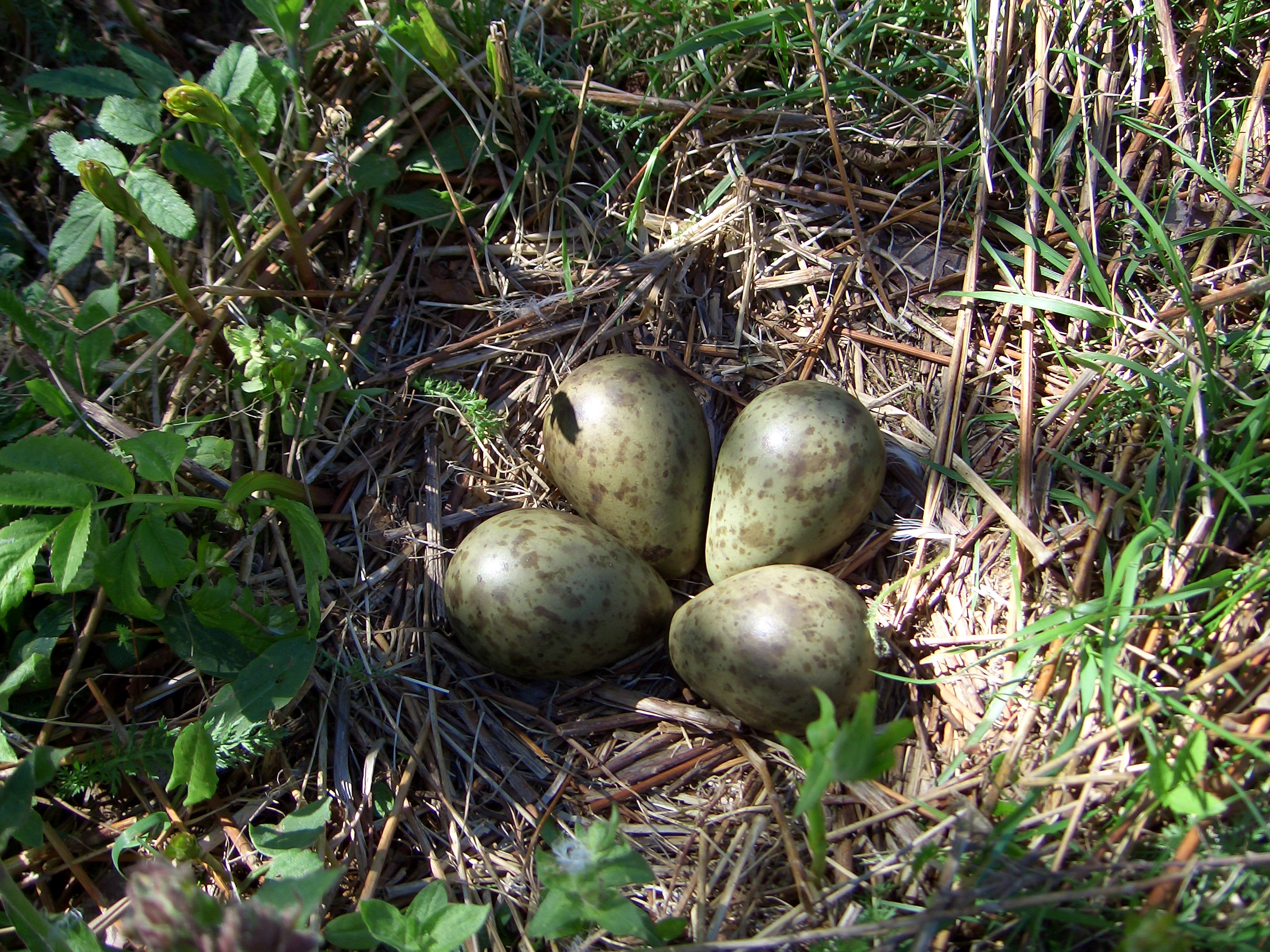
Clutch of eggs

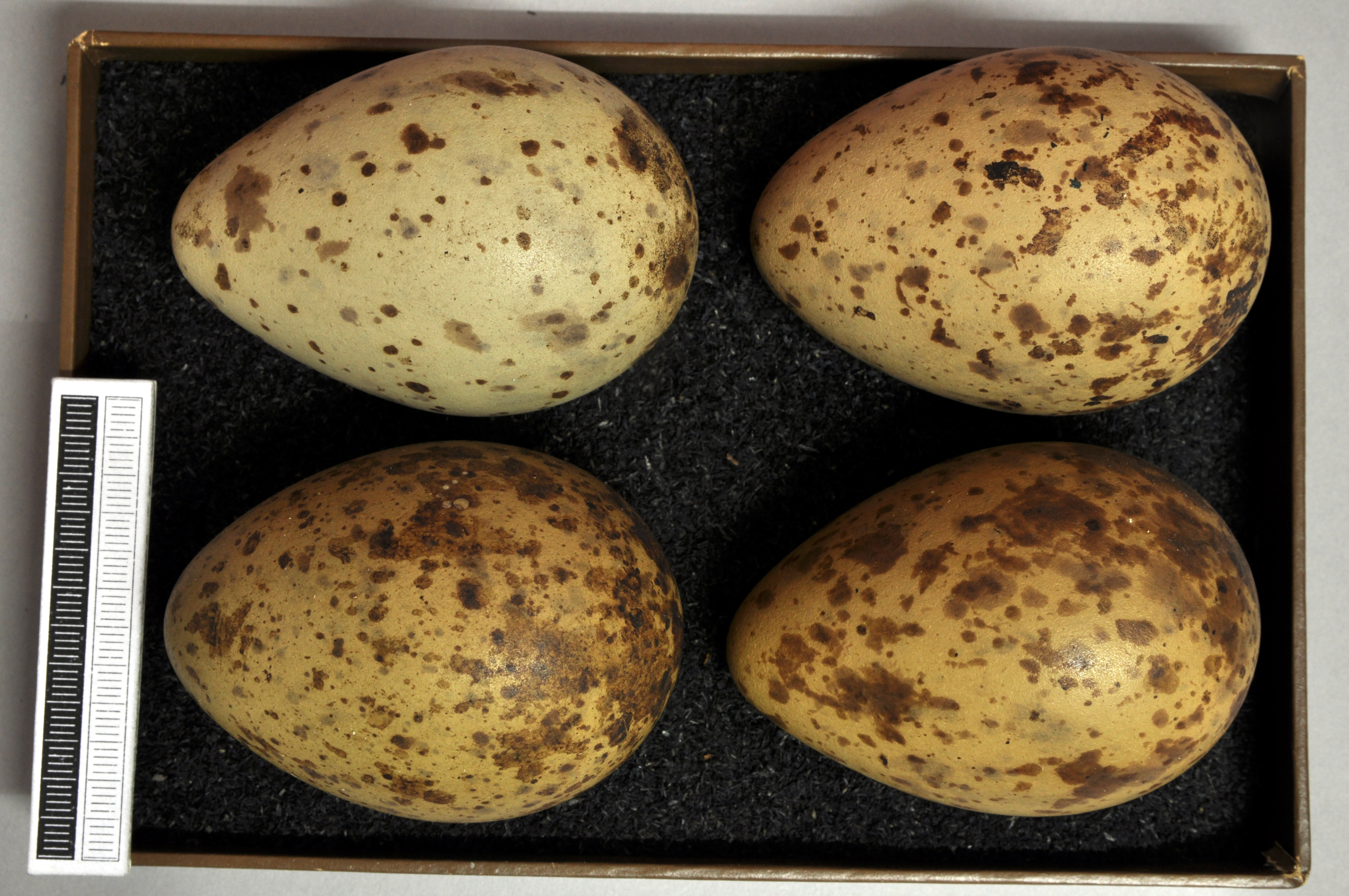
Eggs Museum Wiesbaden, Germany

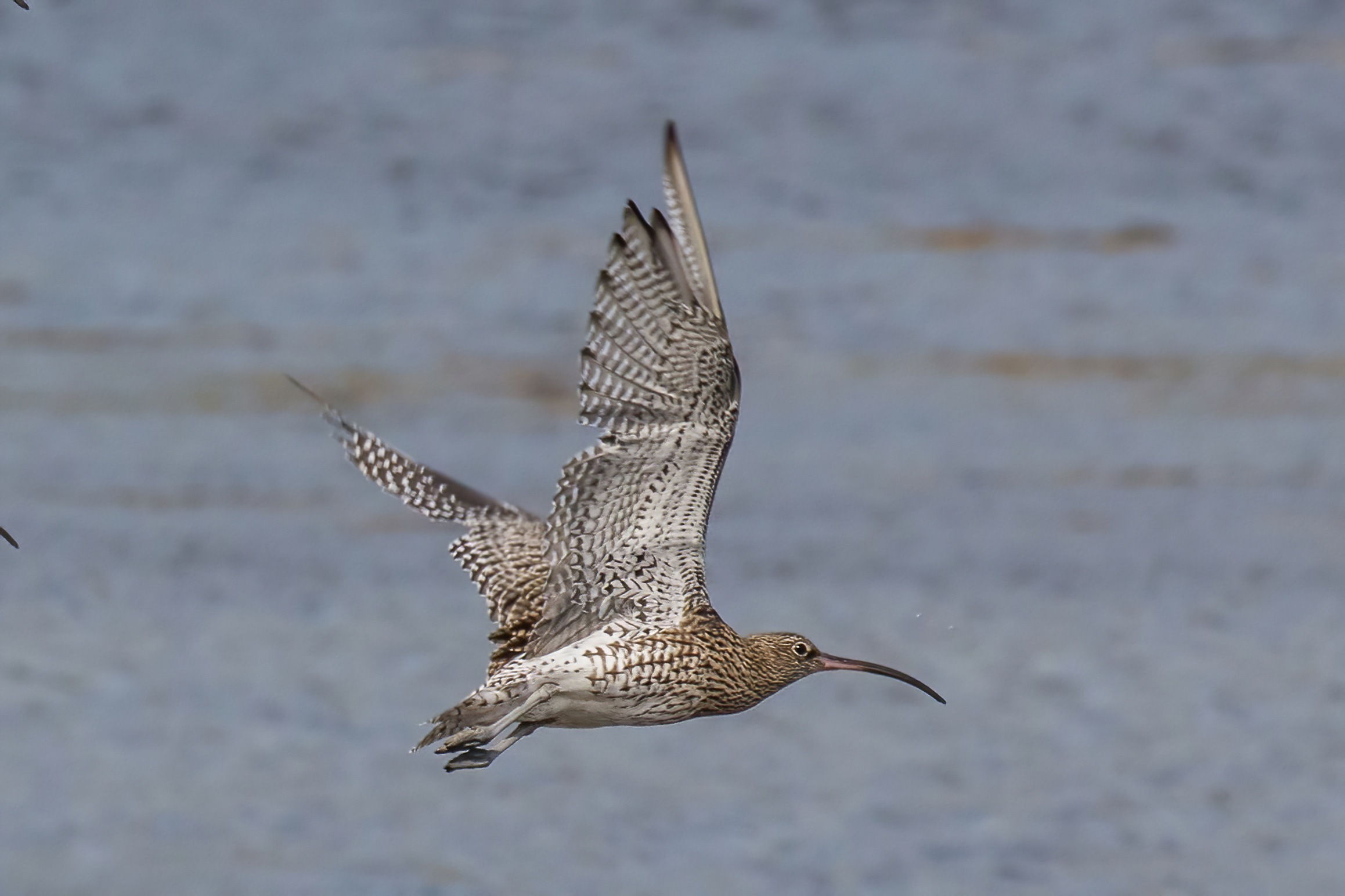
In flight, Argyll, Scotland

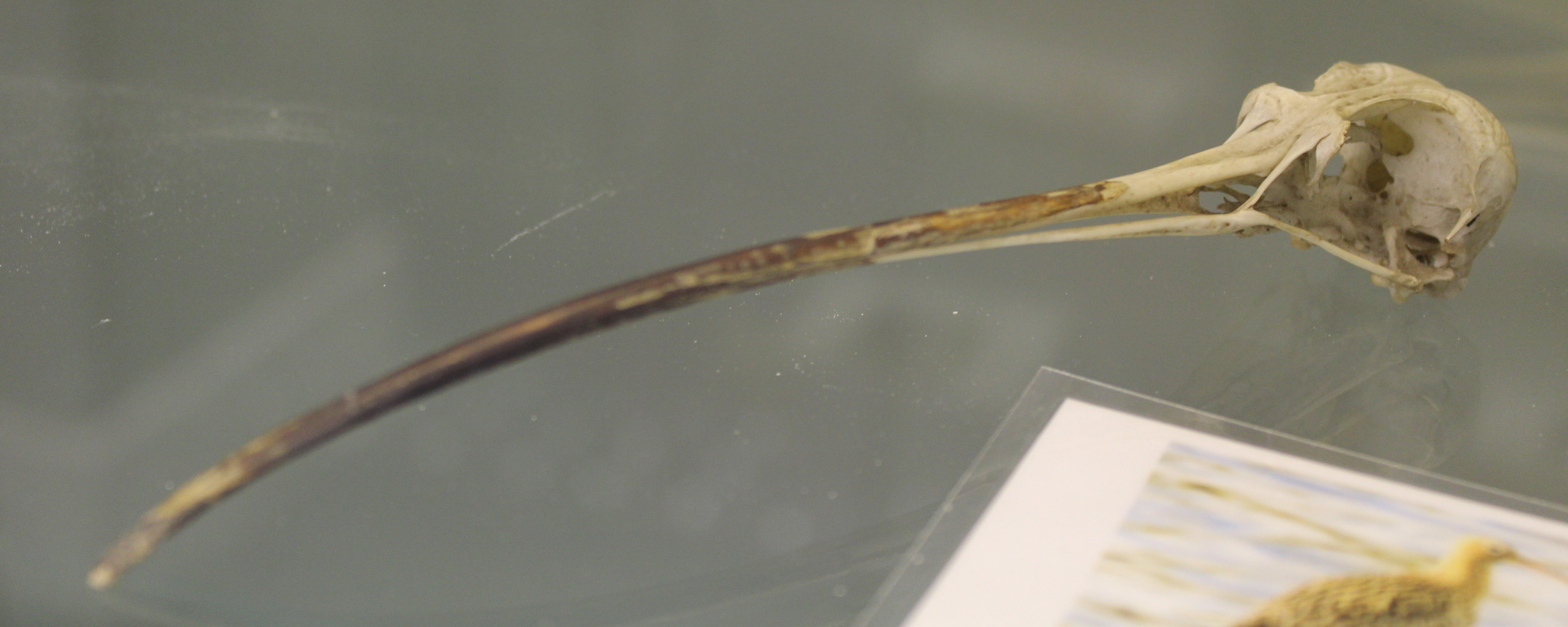
Skull

=== Food and feeding ===
The Eurasian curlew feeds by probing soft mud for small invertebrates, but will also pick up small crabs and earthworms from the surface when the opportunity arises.

=== Predation ===
Eurasian curlew eggs are preyed upon by foxes and raptors. In addition, sheep have been recorded preying on the eggs by the BBC nature series Springwatch.

== Status ==
The Eurasian curlew was formerly listed as a species of Least Concern by the IUCN, due to its extensive range and relatively large population. However, its population was found to be declining at a very rapid rate. Following an evaluation of population trends, this classification was found to be outdated and the status of the species was consequently upgraded to Near Threatened status in 2008. Although it is a common bird, its numbers are noticeably declining, particularly in the United Kingdom and Ireland, which together account for around a quarter of the global population. Between 1996 and 2016, the population is estimated to have declined by over 50% in England and Scotland, over 80% in Wales, and over 90% in Ireland. At the end of 2015 it was placed on the United Kingdom's Red List of the most endangered bird species. The curlew is one of the species to which the Agreement on the Conservation of African-Eurasian Migratory Waterbirds (AEWA) applies.

Research by scientists at the British Trust for Ornithology suggests that curlew populations in the UK have been negatively affected in areas with high levels of arable farming and afforestation which have reduced its natural habitats of open grasslands.
