= P. Lond. 131 =

Egyptian papyrus written in Ancient Greek

Greek Papyri in the British Museum, London 131
- British Library
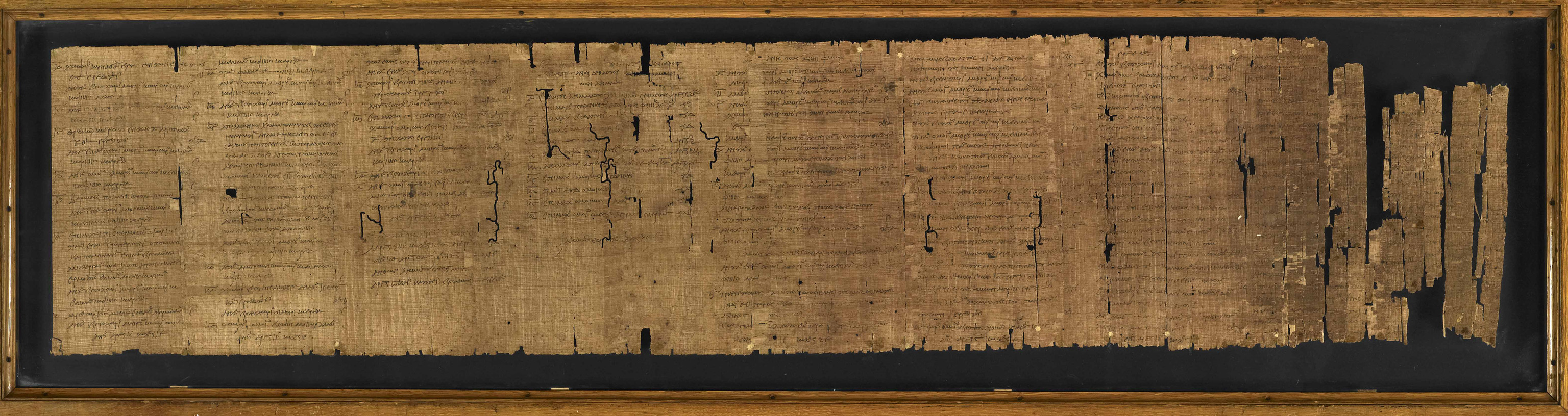
- Fragment of the papyrus in the British Library
- Also known as: P. Lond. 131
- Date: 78–79 and around the year 100 CE
- Place of origin: Egypt
- Language: Ancient Greek
- Contents: economic records Constitution of the Athenians

P. Lond. 131 (Greek Papyri in the British Museum, London 131) is an Egyptian papyrus written in Ancient Greek between 78 and 79 CE and around 100 CE. Discovered shortly before 1890, it currently consists of four scrolls inscribed on both sides. The recto contains records of income and expenses from an estate near Hermopolis, while the verso preserves nearly the entire text of Aristotle's Constitution of the Athenians.

== Origins and content ==
The papyrus was originally used between 78 and 79 CE. Didymos, the manager of an estate belonging to Epimachos near Hermopolis, recorded accounts of expenses and income on the inner side of the scrolls. After these accounts became obsolete, the outer side was reused by students – likely for reasons of economy – to transcribe the text of the Constitution of the Athenians.

=== Recto ===
The recto of the P. Lond. 131 scrolls contains Didymos' financial records for the estate of Epimachos, located in the nome of Hermopolis. The entries are organized by Egyptian months, with each month beginning with a dated header. One column lists income, followed by several columns of expenses, with totals calculated at the bottom. The month's summary concludes with a balance carried forward, expressed in silver.

The first scroll comprises 11 columns, covering the months of Thout and Paopi (expenses up to the 16th day), corresponding to August 29–September 27, 78 CE (expenses up to September 13). These notes primarily detail work on dykes related to the Nile flood, irrigation, fertilization, and land clearing on non-flooded fields. Toward the end of this period, preparations for sowing began.

The second scroll, also with 11 columns, spans parts of the months Hathor (no income, expenses from the 14th), Tobi (from the 16th), and Meshir (expenses only up to the 4th). The missing period from 1 Koiak to 15 Tobi is attributed to Didymos' illness. In the Julian calendar, this corresponds to November 10, 78 CE–February 24, 79 CE (expenses up to January 29). Didymos records sowing activities (in Hathor), irrigation, weeding, field fertilization, and vineyard work.

The third scroll, with 6 columns, includes fragments of accounts from Parmouti (expenses only from the 25th) and Pashons (income for the full month, expenses up to the 15th), equivalent to April 20–May 25, 79 CE (expenses up to May 10). This period involved harvesting, threshing, and vineyard labor. An additional partial column, recording expenses up to the 20th of Pachon, is visible but was erased as that section of the papyrus was not reused for transcribing the Constitution of the Athenians.

The fourth scroll contains accounts from 78 CE for the months Paremhat (from the 23rd) and Parmouti.

These accounts provide insight into agricultural practices in ancient Egypt through the specific example of Epimachos' estate. The estate included fields – often named after former owners – and a plot termed chorion, which housed a vineyard, palm grove, and garden. The total cultivated area ranged from 79 to 89 hectares. Alongside wheat, crops included lentils and fenugreek (foenum graecum), with reeds harvested and date palms possibly grown among the vines. Livestock comprised sheep, chickens, and pigeons, with three donkeys used for transport. Cows and oxen were rented for threshing. Not all fields were directly managed by Epimachos' workers; some were likely leased or farmed in partnership. Epimachos frequently collaborated with neighbors on dyke repairs.

The estate employed permanent workers, with the names of seven (including one woman) recurring in the records. Didymos does not mention their wages, which could indicate they were either slaves or salaried directly by the estate owner. Another group consisted of day laborers hired as needed; the largest number (20) worked on the 13th of Paopi during the Nile flood. Their wages varied seasonally from 2 obols to 1 drachma, with 3 obols being the most common daily rate. Other workers, such as a mecanarios operating a waterwheel, appear sporadically without recorded payment from Didymos, possibly indicating they were slaves, as suggested by Anna Świderkówna.

According to Allan Chester Johnson, the estate's annual maintenance cost was 2,000–2,500 silver drachmas. Didymos' notes reveal that wheat fields were fertilized with sebakh.

=== Verso ===
The verso was inscribed around 100 CE. Rhodes suggests the late 1st or early 2nd century, while Kulesza allows for the early second half of the 2nd century.

The scribe began with commentary on Demosthenes' speech Against Meidias but, after a few lines, abandoned it, crossed out the text, and started anew from the opposite end of the scroll. The transcribed work was the Constitution of the Athenians, attributed to Aristotle. The students' copy likely lacked the opening section, as space was left for its later addition. Minor gaps also appear in sections later assigned to chapters 25, 41, and 60, which Georg Kaibel attributes to defects in earlier copies.

Four students participated in the transcription, identifiable by their distinct handwriting. The second and third scribes wrote in sloppy letter case, while the others used cursive with frequent abbreviations. The division of labor did not fully align with the scroll boundaries. The text was carefully reviewed, with most corrections (all from column 13 onward) made by the fourth student.

The first three scrolls are labeled α, β, and γ, with the fourth designated <δ> by analogy. The dimensions and contents of the scrolls are summarized below:

| Scroll | Dimensions | | Recto | | Verso | | |
| Scroll | Width | Length | Number of columns | Period | Text columns | Scribe | A.P. chapters |
|---|---|---|---|---|---|---|---|
| 1. α | 28 cm | 220 cm | 11 | August–September 78 | 1–11 (11) | I | 1–29.i |
| 2. β | 28 cm | 166.5 cm | 11 | November 78–February 79 | 12–24 (13) | I (column 12), II (13–20), III (20–24) | 29.ii–61.i |
| 3. γ | 28 cm | 91.5 cm | 6 | April–May 79 | 25–30 (6) | IV | 46.i–63.iv |
| 4. <δ> | 25 cm | 79 cm | ? | January–February 78 | 31–37 (7) | III | 64.i–69.ii |

== Discovery and publication ==
The exact location and circumstances of the papyrus' discovery are unknown, but it was likely purchased by the British Museum shortly after its discovery in Egypt. The acquisition is dated between 1888 and 1890. The purchase was made by E. A. Wallis Budge. Frederic G. Kenyon identified the Constitution of the Athenians on February 26, 1890, and published its text on January 30, 1891 – 11 days after its discovery was announced in The Times. A facsimile of the papyrus, completed on March 1, 1891, was produced on 22 plates. The verso became a focus of study by scholars such as Kenyon, Ulrich von Wilamowitz-Moellendorff, Georg Kaibel, Friedrich Blass, and Adolf Bauer. The text was finalized in 1903 with the addition of further fragments.

The recto was published by Kenyon in 1893, with the first three scrolls re-edited by Anna Świderkówna in 1960.

Initially, the fourth scroll was cataloged separately as P.Lond. 131*, but the museum standardized its nomenclature. The papyrus has been digitized and is accessible on the British Library website.

== Bibliography ==
- Świderek, Anna (1957). Prywatny majątek ziemski w Egipcie Wespazjana i stosowana tam technika rolna. Według P. Lond. 131 [Private Landed Estate in Vespasian’s Egypt and Agricultural Techniques Used There: Based on P. Lond. 131] (in Polish). Vol. 7. Warsaw: Institute of the History of Material Culture, Polish Academy of Sciences.
