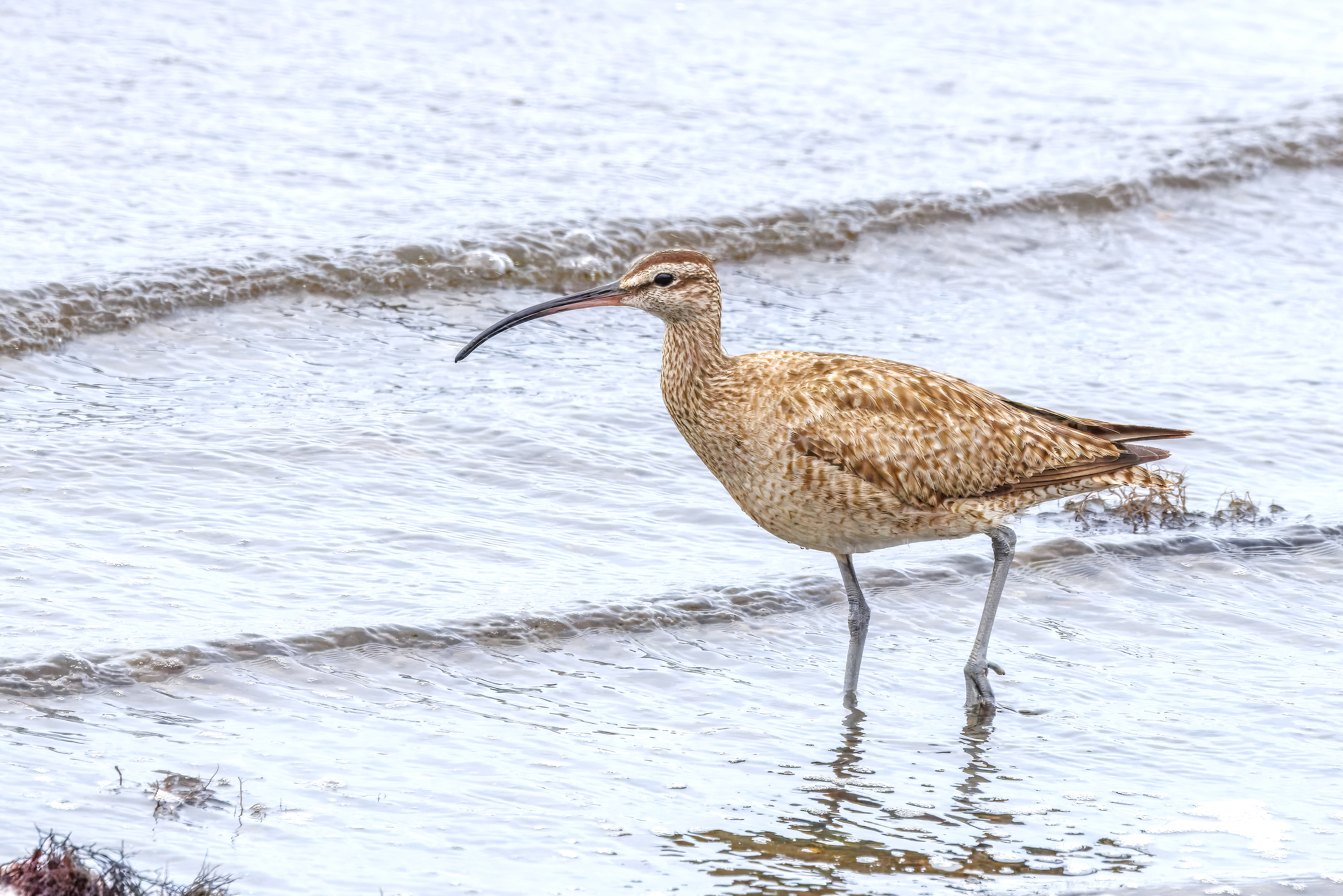
- Chiloé Island, Chile

Conservation status
- Secure (NatureServe)

Scientific classification
- Kingdom: Animalia
- Phylum: Chordata
- Class: Aves
- Order: Charadriiformes
- Family: Scolopacidae
- Genus: Numenius
- Species: N. hudsonicus

Binomial name
- Numenius hudsonicus Latham, 1790
- The range of Numenius hudsonicus Breeding Migration Non-breeding

Synonyms
- Scolopax phæopus hudsonicus

= Hudsonian whimbrel =

Species of bird

The Hudsonian whimbrel or Hudsonian curlew (Numenius hudsonicus) is a wader in the large family Scolopacidae. It is one of the most widespread of the curlews, breeding across much of subarctic North America.

== Scientific Classification ==
This species and the Eurasian whimbrel were split in 2019 based on genetic and morphological differences and separate breeding ranges.

Two subspecies are recognized:

- Numenius hudsonicus rufiventris – Vigors, 1829: breeds in Alaska and northwestern Canada
- Numenius hudsonicus hudsonicus – Latham, 1790: (Hudsonian curlew) breeds in Hudson Bay area to northeastern Canada

== Description ==
This is a fairly large wader, though mid-sized as a member of the curlew genus. The English name is imitative of the bird's call. The genus name Numenius is from Ancient Greek noumenios, a bird mentioned by Hesychius. It is associated with the curlews because it appears to be derived from neos, "new" and mene, "moon", referring to the crescent-shaped bill.

It is 37–47 cm (15–19 in) in length, 75–90 cm (30–35 in) in wingspan, and 270–493 g (9.5–17.4 oz; 0.595–1.087 lb) in weight. It is mainly greyish brown, with a rump pattern uniform with upperparts, and a long curved bill (longest in the adult female) with a kink rather than a smooth curve.

The usual call is a rippling whistle, prolonged into a trill for the song.

The only similar common species over most of this bird's range are larger curlews. The whimbrel is smaller, has a shorter, decurved bill and has a central crown stripe and strong supercilia.

== Distribution and habitat ==
The Hudsonian whimbrel is a migratory coastal bird, wintering on coasts in southern North America and South America. In the mangroves of Colombia, whimbrel roost sites are located in close proximity to feeding territories and away from potential sources of mainland predators, but not away from areas of human disturbance.

== Ecology ==
This species feeds by probing soft mud for small invertebrates and by picking small crabs and similar prey off the surface. Before migration, berries become an important part of their diet.

The nest is a bare scrape on tundra or Arctic moorland. Three to five eggs are laid. Adults are very defensive of nesting area and will even attack humans who come too close.

Near the end of the 19th century, hunting on their migration routes took a heavy toll on this bird's numbers; the population has since recovered, although they are still classified as of High Conservation Concern in North America.

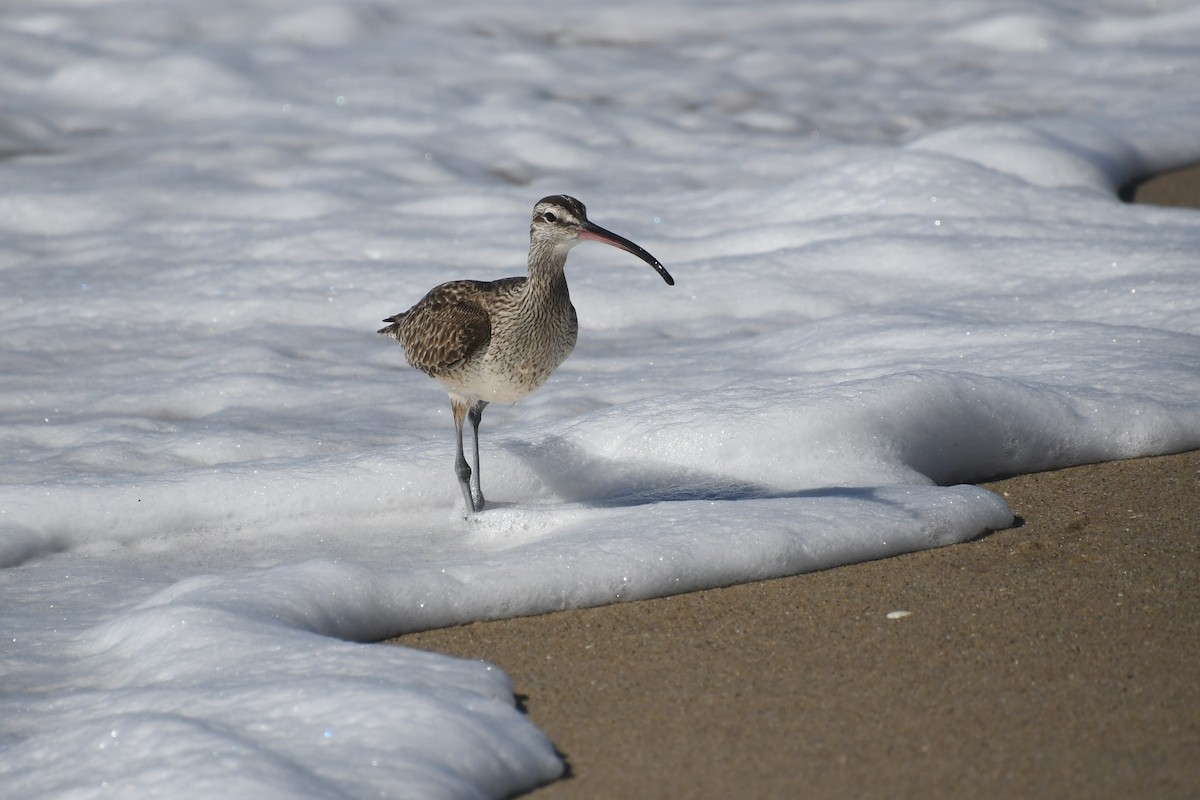
Numenius hudsonicus hudsonicus on a beach in Florida
