= The Big Tree, Rockport =

Live oak tree in Texas

Coordinates: 28.15252°N 96.97665°W

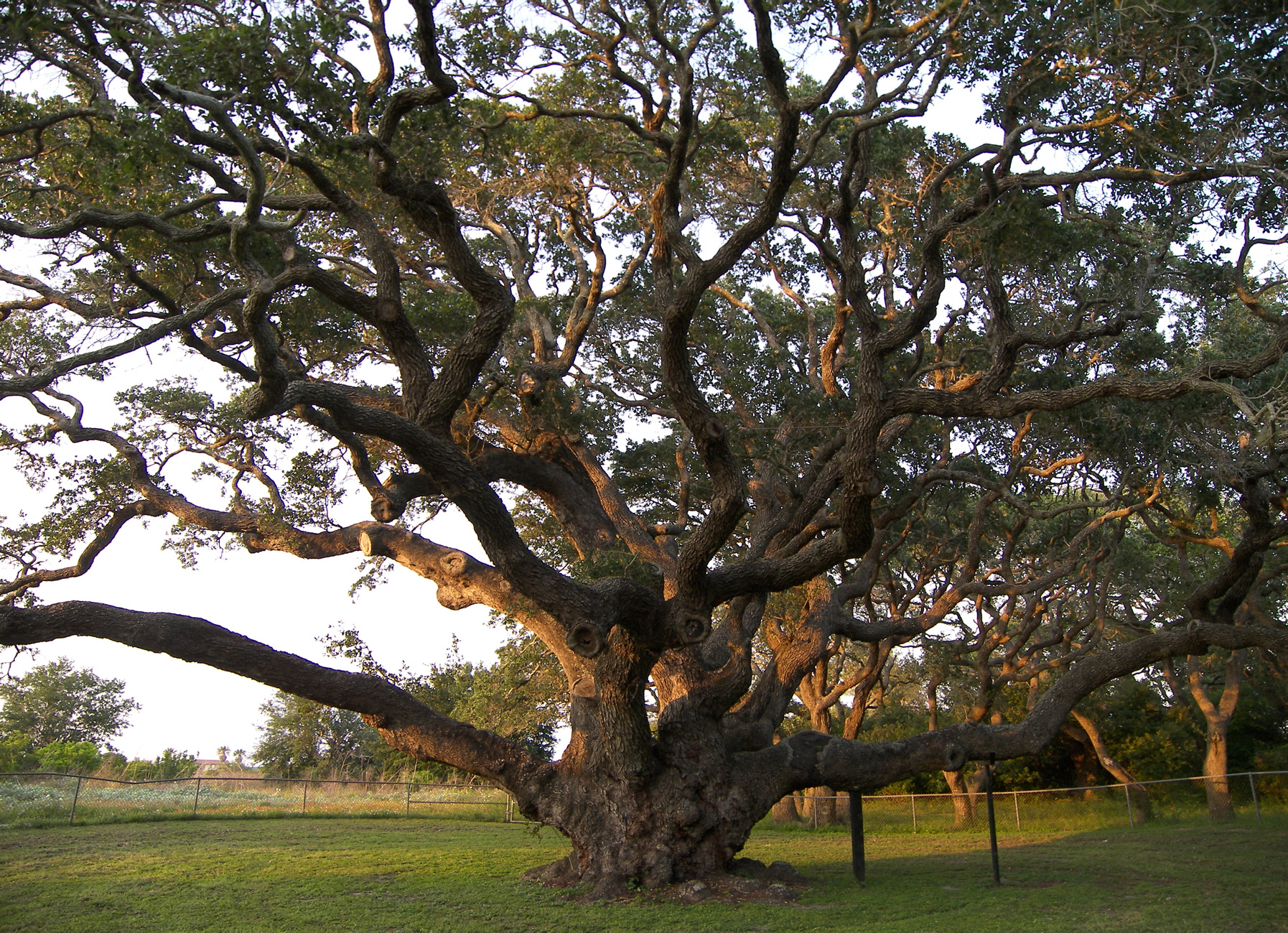
Goose Island Oak (the Big Tree), Rockport, Texas

The "Big Tree", near the town of Rockport, Texas, is one of the most famous live oaks in the world after being named "Texas State Champion Virginia Live Oak" (Quercus virginiana) in 1969. The tree retained that title until 2003, when a larger oak was discovered in Brazoria County, Texas. The "Big Tree" is still thought to be one of the largest live oak specimens in the United States.

Despite the widespread, historically significant devastation of the surrounding region, the "Big Tree" was relatively unscathed by Hurricane Harvey, a category 4 hurricane that hit Rockport on August 25, 2017.

== History ==
The "Big Tree" is near the town of Lamar in Goose Island State Park. During the Civil War, Lamar was bombarded and destroyed by the Union Navy. All that remained were the ruins of a few old shellcrete (oyster shell concrete) homes, a Catholic chapel, and the "Big Tree".

Before the 1931 opening of the 1.5-mile-long (2.4 km) Copano Causeway, visitors coming from south of Copano Bay, such as from Corpus Christi, had to drive many miles inland to get around the bay to reach the "Big Tree". Visiting the "Big Tree" today is easy with available roadside parking. The base of the tree is cordoned off to dissuade climbers, but visitors are nonetheless able to stand below the crown to appreciate the tree's massive size.

According to climatologists, the "Big Tree" has survived from anywhere between forty and fifty major hurricanes, including the most recent, Harvey, as well as numerous floods, droughts and wildfires.

== Quercus virginiana ==
The "Big Tree" is a species of oak called Quercus virginiana. These oak trees can be found from Texas to Florida with their range extending northward to Virginia. The common name for the Quercus virginiana is the live oak but includes the names southern live oak and the Texas live oak too. Live oak growth rate and size vary by location. The largest examples tend to grow further inland, while live oaks in coastal regions are usually smaller. Therefore, the size of the "Big Tree" makes it a rare specimen for a coastal location.

== Specifications ==
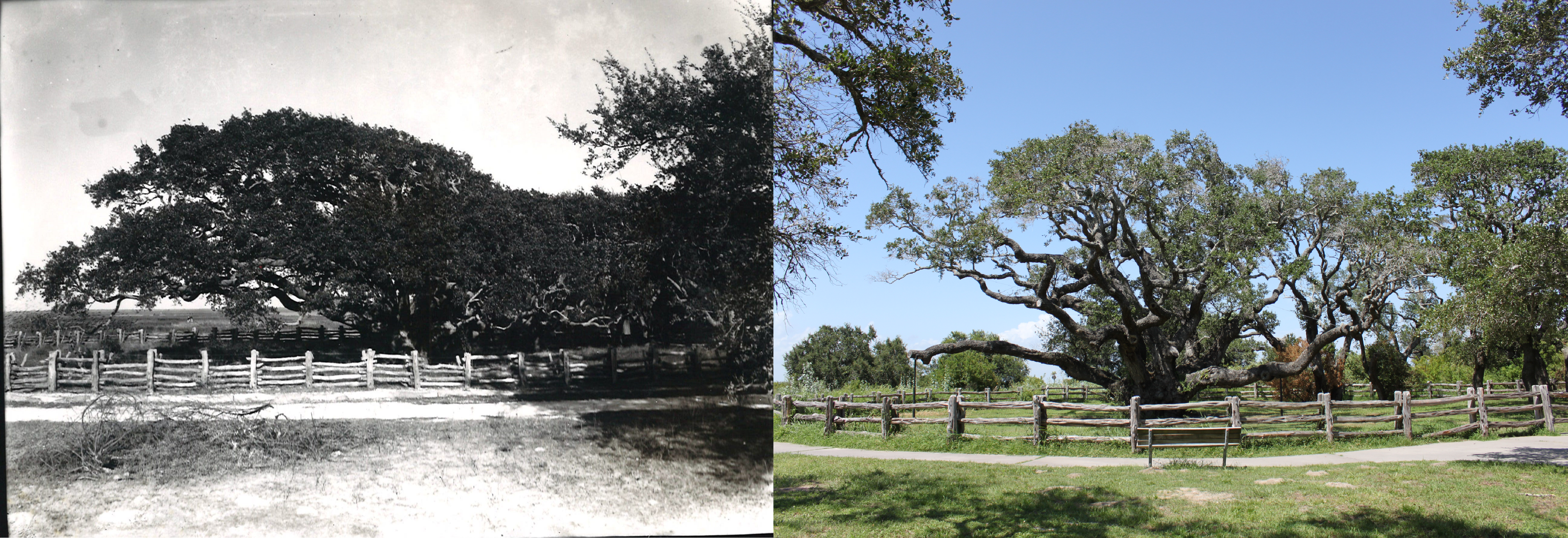
83-year difference in the Big Tree near Rockport, Texas

The Texas Forest Service estimates the tree to be over 1,000 years old, while other recent estimates place it nearer to 2,000 years old. Also known as Bishop Oak and Lamar Oak, the "Big Tree" is a charter member (#16) of the Live Oak Society and has been the subject of one of Ripley's "Believe It or Not" cartoons. The "Big Tree" is possibly the oldest extant live oak in the world. It possesses a circumference of over 35 feet and is more than 45 feet tall, while the crown's spread is 90 feet.

"Record" or "champion" trees are determined by a cumulative measure of their girth, their spread, and their height, however, the near-continuous Gulf breeze limits the height of the "Big Tree"; therefore, there exist many other live oak specimens that are actually taller, but once girth is factored in, that measure makes the "Big Tree" the second-largest live oak in Texas.

== See also ==
- List of individual trees
