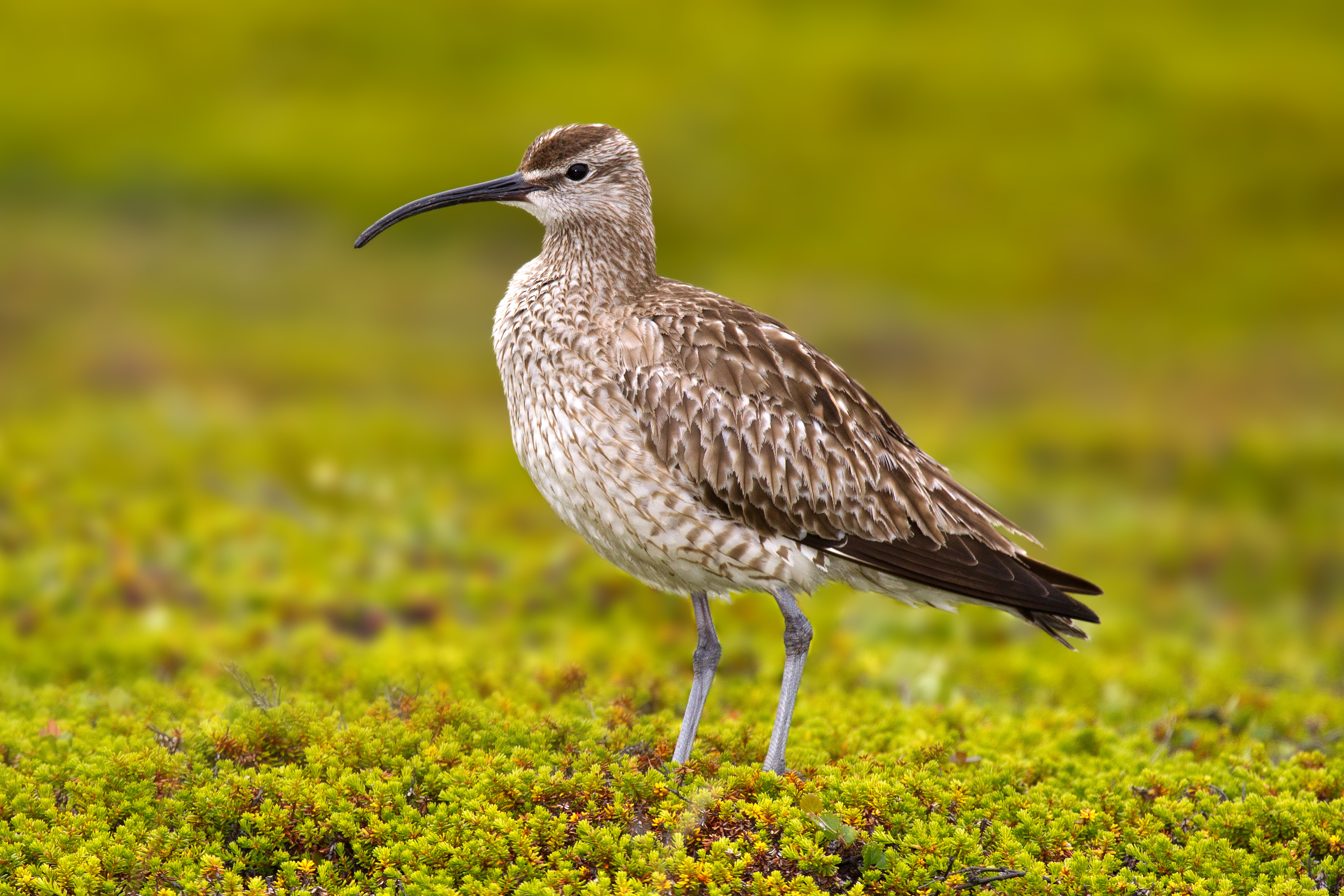
- N. p. phaeopus
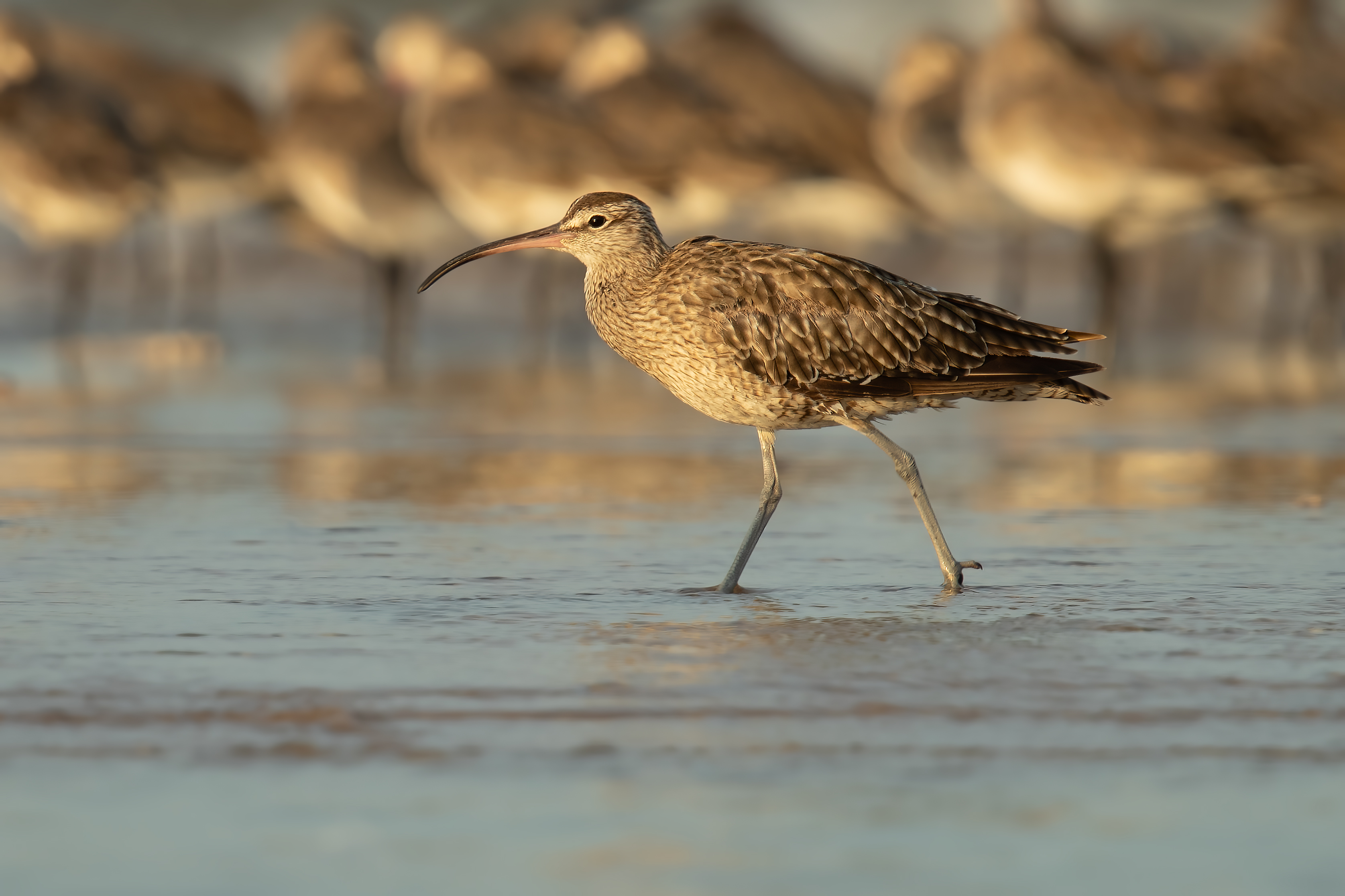
- N. p. variegatus

Conservation status
- Least Concern (IUCN 3.1)

Scientific classification
- Kingdom: Animalia
- Phylum: Chordata
- Class: Aves
- Order: Charadriiformes
- Family: Scolopacidae
- Genus: Numenius
- Species: N. phaeopus

Binomial name
- Numenius phaeopus (Linnaeus, 1758)
- Eurasian whimbrel range Breeding Migration Non-breeding

Synonyms
- Scolopax phæopus Linnaeus, 1758

= Eurasian whimbrel =

Species of bird

The Eurasian whimbrel (Numenius phaeopus), historically known as the white-rumped whimbrel in North America, is a wader in the large family Scolopacidae. It is one of the most widespread of the curlews, breeding across much of subarctic Palearctic region and Europe as far south as Scotland. This species and the Hudsonian whimbrel were split in 2019, although some taxonomic authorities still consider them to be conspecific.

== Taxonomy ==
The Eurasian whimbrel was formally described by Carl Linnaeus in 1758 in the tenth edition of his Systema Naturae under the binomial name Scolopax phaeopus. It is now placed with the curlews in the genus Numenius that was introduced by Mathurin Jacques Brisson in 1760.

The genus name Numenius is from Ancient Greek noumenios, a bird mentioned by Hesychius. It is associated with the curlews because it appears to be derived from neos, "new" and mene, "moon", referring to the crescent-shaped bill. The specific epithet phaeopus is the Medieval Latin name for the bird, from Ancient Greek phaios, "dusky" and pous, "foot". The English name "whimbrel" is imitative of the bird's call.

Five subspecies are recognised:

- N. p. phaeopus (Linnaeus, 1758) – nominate, breeds from Norway to north central Siberia; winters in Africa and South and Southeast Asia
- N. p. islandicus Brehm, 1831 – breeds mainly in Iceland, but also in Greenland, the Faroe Islands, and Scotland; winters mainly in West Africa, but ranges from southwestern Europe to Benin and Togo
- N. p. alboaxillaris Lowe, 1921 – breeds from western Kazakhstan to southwestern Siberia and migrates south to spend the non-breeding season in south-east Africa.
- N. p. rogachevae Tomkovich, 2008 – breeds in north central Siberia; winters in east Africa and west India
- N. p. variegatus (Scopoli, 1786) – breeds in north-eastern Siberia; winters in India to Australia

The Hudsonian whimbrel (N. hudsonicus) was formerly considered to be conspecific. The two species were split based on genetic and morphological differences and separate breeding ranges.

== Differences in species ==
The common whimbrel was traditionally considered a sub-cosmopolitan bird, breeding in Russia and Canada, then migrating to coasts all around the world to spend the winter. However, the North American population of whimbrels was considered distinct enough to be considered a separate species from the common whimbrel. In 2020, the New World population was recognised as a separate species, with the whimbrel in North America being assigned to the binomial name Numenius hudsonicus.

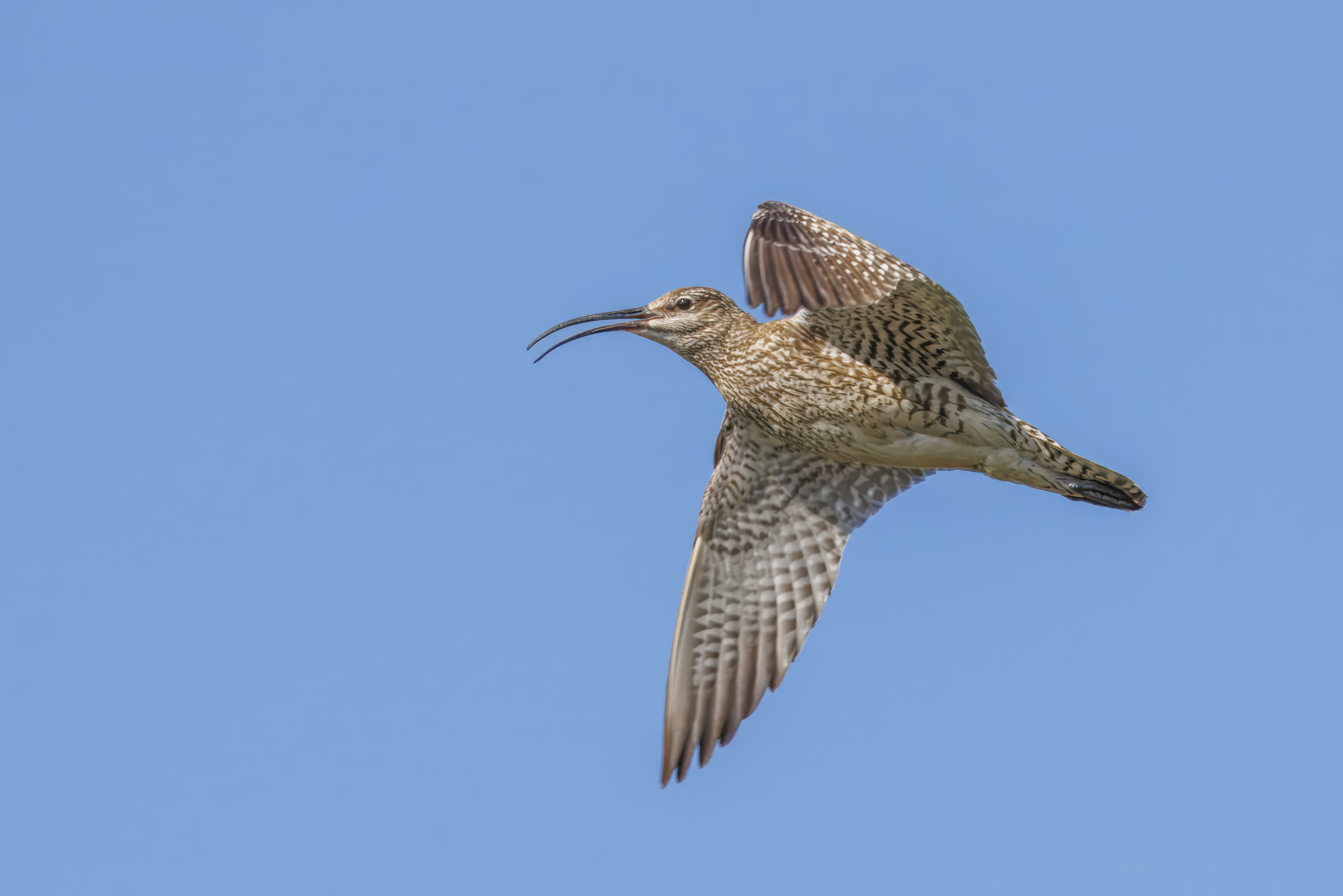
in Iceland

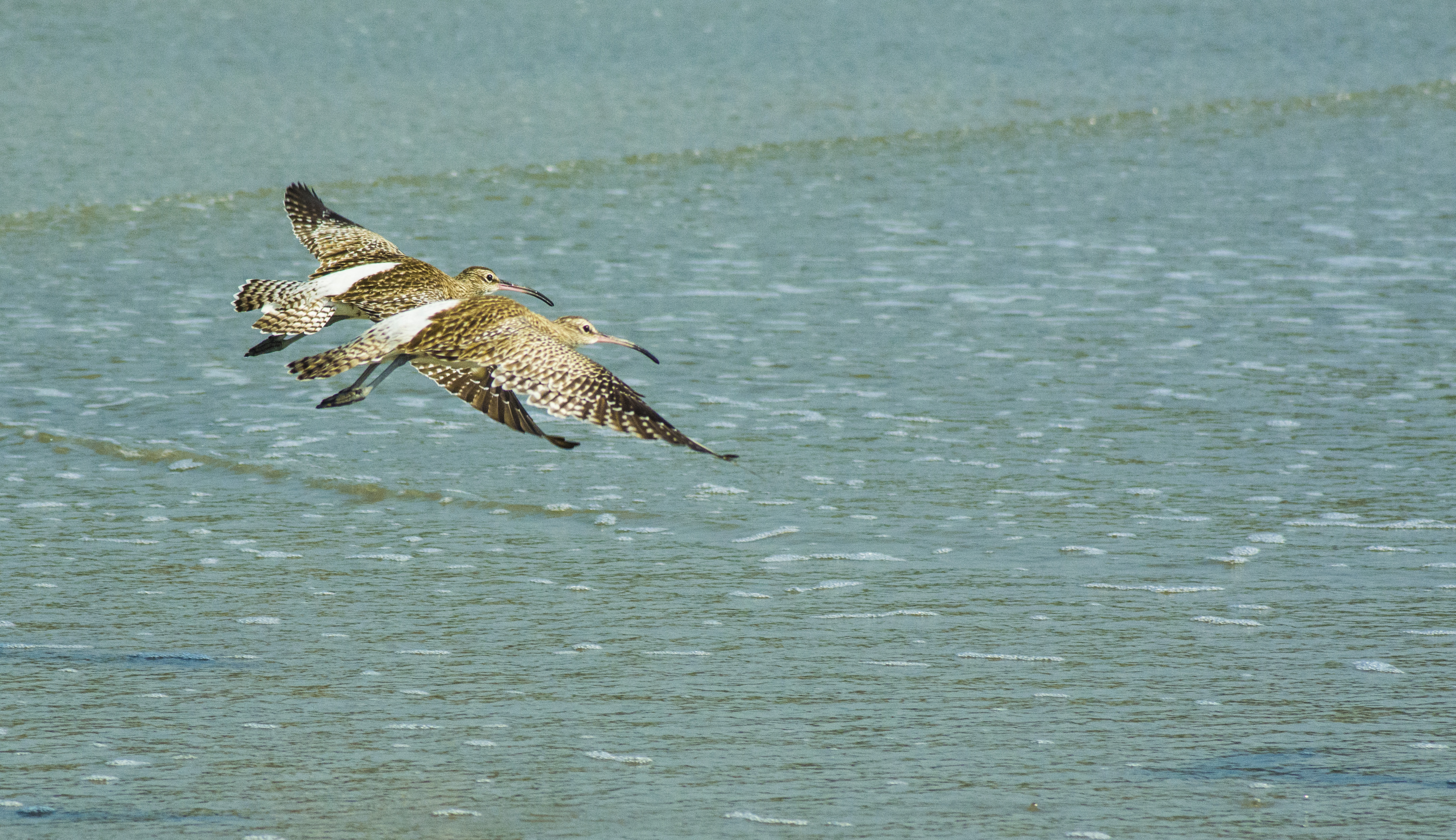
in India
the distinctive white rump is visible

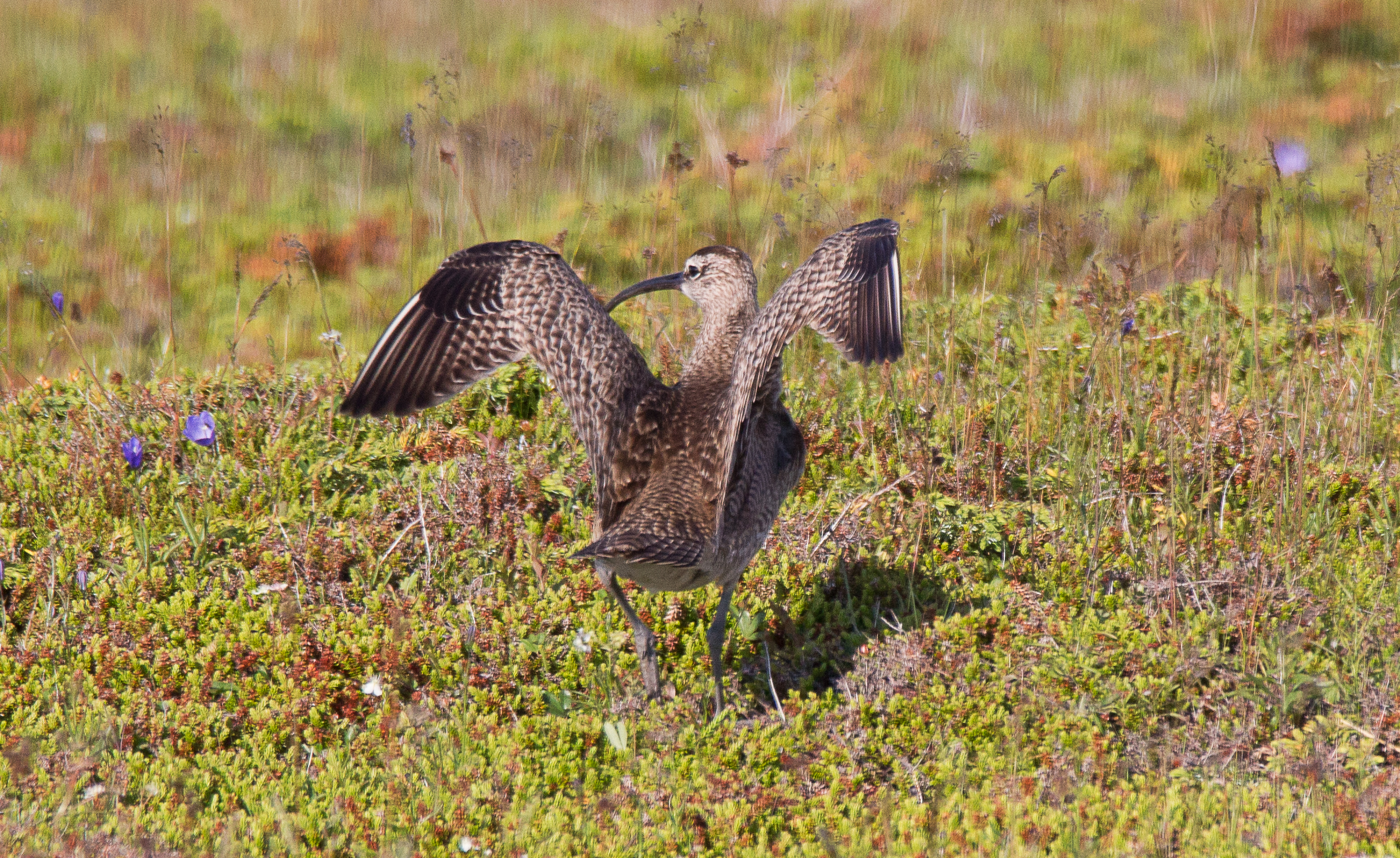
A Hudsonian whimbrel in Newfoundland, Canada. The rump is similar to the rest of the body in patterning, unlike the Eurasian whimbrel, which has a white rump.

Whilst very similar at an initial glance, there are several features that distinguish whimbrel species in the Old and New World. In appearance, the New World species has a more "faded" appearance, with differences in the supercilium and crown. By far the most significant difference may be seen in the lower half of the bird. Whimbrels in Europe and Asia have a primarily white rump that can be seen in flight, while whimbrel in the New World have a rump similar in colour to the rest of the bird - drab brown with dark streaking. As a result, whimbrel on vagrancy trips to North America may be known as the "white-rumped whimbrel", while whimbrel vagrants from North America to Europe may be known as "Hudsonian whimbrel".

When the context of their location is known, both species may be simply known as the whimbrel.

== Description ==
The Eurasian whimbrel is a fairly large wader, though mid-sized as a member of the curlew genus. It is 37–47 cm (15–19 in) in length, 75–90 cm (30–35 in) in wingspan, and 270–493 g (9.5–17.4 oz; 0.595–1.087 lb) in weight. It is mainly greyish brown, with a white back and rump (subspecies N. p. phaeopus and N. p. alboaxillaris only), and a long curved beak with a kink rather than a smooth curve. The usual call is a rippling whistle, prolonged into a trill for the song.

== Distribution and migration ==
The whimbrel occurs in Ireland and the United Kingdom, and it breeds in Scotland, particularly around Shetland, Orkney, the Outer Hebrides as well as the mainland at Sutherland and Caithness. lt is a migratory bird wintering on coasts in Africa, South Asia and Australasia. It is also a coastal bird during bird migration and fairly gregarious outside the breeding season. In Iceland, it lives in lowland plains, grasslands, wetlands in flat, wet areas with low vegetation, but to a lesser extent in higher areas.

== Behaviour and ecology ==
=== Food and feeding ===
This Eurasian whimbrel feeds by probing soft mud for small invertebrates and by picking small crabs and similar prey off the surface. Before migration, berries become an important part of its diet. It has also been observed taking insects, specifically blue tiger butterflies.

=== Breeding ===
The nest is a bare scrape on tundra or Arctic moorland, often in low vegetation or moss but rarely in deep grass or marshland. Three to five eggs are laid. The mother remains motionless until a potential threat draws too close, then flies off a short distance and walks around making noises to try to lure the threat away. The chicks are fluffy, yellow and black, with a short beak (unlike the adults) and strong scaly grey legs. Within a couple weeks of hatching they become quite mobile on the ground, and soon thereafter, the nest is abandoned.

== Conservation ==
The whimbrel is listed in the Agreement on the Conservation of African-Eurasian Migratory Waterbirds. Near the end of the 19th century, hunting on the Eurasian whimbrel's migration routes took a heavy toll on its population, which has since recovered. It is listed as Least Concern on the IUCN Red List and has been negatively impacted by climate change, habitat destruction and outbreaks of avian flu to which it is susceptible.

In Iceland, home to one-third of the world's breeding population, the populations are crashing in most areas. Development is considered the most likely cause.
