= Goose Island State Park =

State park in Texas, United States

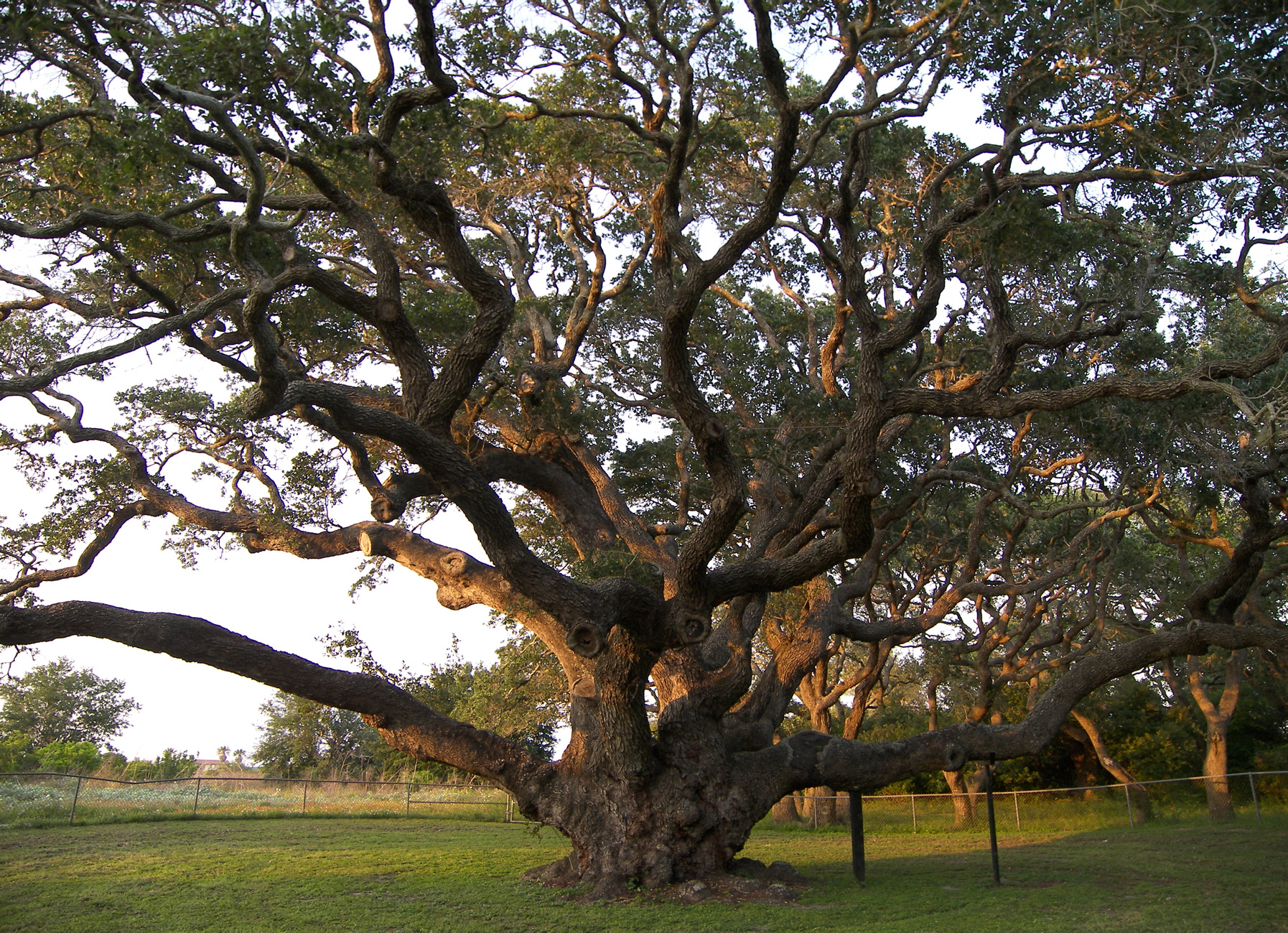
- The "Big Tree" at Goose Island State Park is thought to be 1000 years old.

- Location within Texas Location within the United States
- Location: Aransas County, Texas
- Nearest city: Rockport
- Coordinates: 28°08′06″N 96°59′13″W
- Area: 321.4 acres (130 ha)
- Created: 1931-1935
- Visitors: 154,893 (in 2025)
- Governing body: Texas Parks and Wildlife Department
- Website: Official site

Goose Island State Park is a 321.4 acres (130 ha) state park in Aransas County, Texas, United States, located north of the city of Rockport on the coast of the Gulf of Mexico. It is surrounded by both St. Charles and Aransas Bays. The park is managed by the Texas Parks and Wildlife Department.

The park is home to "The Big Tree", a southern live oak, thought to be over 1000 years old. It has a circumference of 35 feet (11 m), is 44 feet (13 m) in height and has a crown spread of 90 feet (27 m).

The park was established on land acquired from private owners between 1931 and 1935. Civilian Conservation Corps Company 1801 did extensive work and built the earliest facilities including the entrance portal, concession building (currently the recreation hall), picnic units, roads, bridges, shelters, tables and benches and drainage systems.

== Activities ==
Although it is located on the seashore, there is no designated swimming area at the park, as the shoreline consists of concrete, oyster shell, mudflat, and marsh grass. Instead, the main park activities include camping, birding, boating, and fishing in the bays. Spotted seatrout, red drum, black drum, southern flounder, and sheepshead are a few of the species of fish caught.

The park averages more than 60,000 overnight campers each year and has about 150,000 visitors annually. There are 45 shade shelters with electricity and water on the island. There are 57 shelters with electricity and water, and 27 with water and no electricity.

== See also ==
- List of Texas state parks
- Aransas National Wildlife Refuge
- George W. Fulton Mansion
- Texas Maritime Museum
