= Anna Świderkówna =

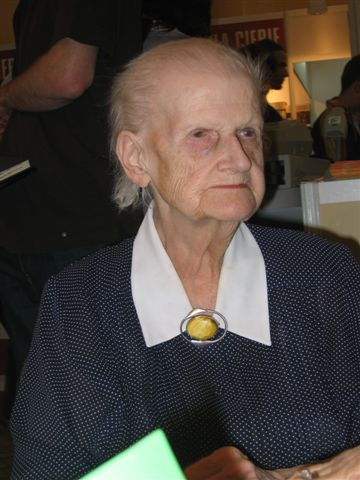
- Born: 5 December 1925; Warsaw, Poland
- Died: 16 August 2008 (aged 82); Warsaw, Poland
- Writing career
- Genre: history

Anna Świderkówna (5 December 1925 – 16 August 2008) was a Polish writer and educator.

== Biography ==
She was born in Warsaw. During World War II, she joined the Home Army and was a nurse in an army hospital during the Warsaw Uprising in 1944. She was captured, sent to a prisoner-of-war camp in Germany and released in June 1945. She studied classical philology at the University of Warsaw. In 1957, she went to Paris on a scholarship to study at the Institut de Papyrologie de la Sorbonne. In 1958, Świderkówna spent nine months in Egypt working on papyri from the Graeco-Roman Museum for the Polish Centre of Mediterranean Archaeology. She was head of the Department of Papyrology at the University of Warsaw from 1961 to 1991.

In 1964, with Mariangela Vandoni, she published Papyrus grecs du Musée Gréco-Romain d’ Alexandrie. She published a number of books in Polish on historical topics for the general public, including Kiedy piaski egipskie przemówiły po grecku ("When the Egyptian Sands Spoke in Greek") (1959), Historie nieznane historii ("Histories Unknown to History") (1962), Hellenika. Wizerunek epoki od Aleksandra do Augusta ("Hellenica. The Age from Alexander to Augustus") (1974) and Siedem Kleopatr ("Seven Cleopatras") (1978). Some of her writing was translated into Czech and Hungarian. She was editor for Słownik pisarzy antycznych ("Dictionary of ancient writers"). Świderkówna also published articles in various magazines, including Tygodnik Powszechny and Gazeta Wyborcza.

In 1978, she joined the Order of Saint Benedict in Żarnowiec. However, she was not accepted as a nun and left the convent. She went on to write a number of books about the Bible, including a series Rozmowy o Biblii ("Talks on the Bible") (1994-2006).

Świderkówna died in Warsaw, 16 August 2008, at the age of 82.

== Awards ==
In 2007, she received the literary prize awarded by the Polish PEN Club.

She was posthumously awarded the Officer's Cross in the Order of Polonia Restituta.
