= Constitution of the Athenians (Aristotle) =

Work by Aristotle

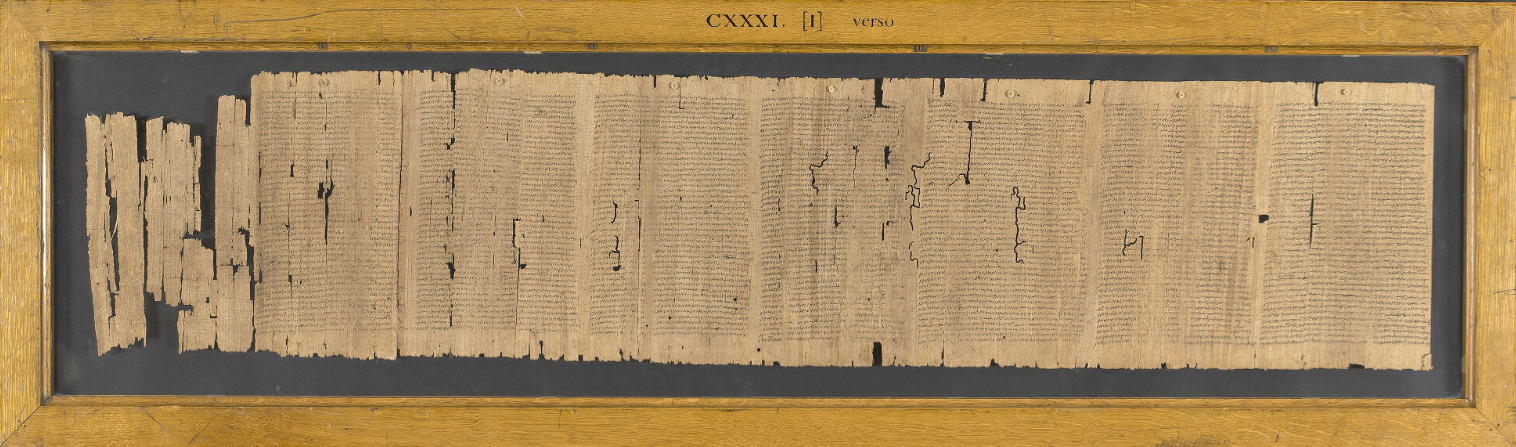
The Aristotelian Constitution of the Athenians, now in the British Library (Papyrus 131, f.6v).

The Constitution of the Athenians, also called the Athenian Constitution (Ancient Greek: Ἀθηναίων πολιτεία, romanized: Athēnaiōn Politeia), is a work by Aristotle or one of his students. The work describes the constitution of Athens. It is preserved on a papyrus roll from Hermopolis, published in 1891 and now in the British Library. A small part of the work also survives on two leaves of a papyrus codex, discovered in the Fayum in 1879 and now in the papyrus collection of the Egyptian Museum of Berlin.

== Discovery ==
The Aristotelian text is unique because it is not a part of the Corpus Aristotelicum as preserved through medieval manuscripts. It was lost until two leaves of a papyrus codex carrying part of the text were discovered in the Fayum in 1879 and published in 1880. A second, more extensive papyrus text was purchased in Egypt by an American missionary in 1890. E. A. Wallis Budge of the British Museum acquired it later that year, and the first edition of it by Frederic G. Kenyon was published in January, 1891. The editions of the Greek text in widest use today are Kenyon's Oxford Classical Text of 1920 and the Teubner edition by Mortimer H. Chambers (1986, second edition 1994). The papyrus text is now held in the British Library.

Ancient accounts of Aristotle credit him with 158 Constitutions of various states; it is widely assumed that these were research for the Politics, and that many of them were written or drafted by his students. Athens, however, was a particularly important state, and where Aristotle was living at the time; therefore it is plausible that, even if students composed the others, Aristotle composed that one himself as a model for the rest. On the other hand, a number of prominent scholars doubt that it was written by Aristotle. If it is a genuine writing of Aristotle, then it is of particular significance, because it is the only one of his extant writings that was actually intended for publication.

Because it purports to supply so much contemporary information previously unknown or unreliable, modern historians have claimed that "the discovery of this treatise constitutes almost a new epoch in Greek historical study". In particular, 21–22, 26.2–4, and 39–40 of the work contain factual information not found in any other extant ancient text.

== Synopsis ==
The Constitution of the Athenians (in ancient Greek Ἀθηναίων πολιτεία, Athenaion Politeia) describes the political system of ancient Athens. According to ancient sources, Aristotle compiled constitutions of 158 Greek states, of which the Constitution of the Athenians is the only one to survive intact. Modern scholars dispute how much of the authorship of these constitutions can be attributed to Aristotle personally; he at least would have been assisted by his students. Modern scholars continue discussing about the many constitutions Aristotle compiled, which include not only Greek, but also non-Greek states. Speculations continue to arise that all the constitutions couldn't have been written by a singular person because many of the descriptions would have been brief and superficial. Therefore, there are many deliberations to this day if Aristotle in reality wrote all 158 constitutions.

The work consists of two parts. The first part, from Chapter 1 to Chapter 41, deals with the different forms of the constitution, from the trial of the Alcmaeonidae until the fall of the Thirty and the restoration of democracy in 403 BC. The lost beginning, which is not preserved on the London papyrus but survives only in a handful of citations in ancient sources and in the epitome of Heraclides Lembus, dealt with the migration of Ion to Athens, the creation of phylai, trittyes and phratries, the kingship of Pandion, the democratic reform of Theseus, the death of Theseus, the change from a monarchy to a system with elected archons under the Codrid dynasty, the cruelty of Hippomenes and the conspiracy of Cylon. The second part describes the city's institutions, including the terms of access to citizenship, magistrates, and the courts.

== Composition date ==
In chapter 54, Aristotle relates that the Festival of Hephaestus was "instituted during the archonship of Cephisophon", which corresponds to 329 BC. In Chapter 62, Aristotle indicates that, at the time he was writing, Athens was still sending officials to Samos. After 322 BC, Samos was no longer under Athenian control. Based on this internal evidence, scholars conclude that the Athenian Constitution was written no earlier than 328 BC and no later than 322 BC. Furthermore, that Aristotle does not mention quinqueremes despite mentioning triremes and quadriremes suggests that it was written no later than 325 BC, when quinqueremes are first recorded in the Athenian Navy.
