= Hesychius of Miletus =

6th-century Byzantine historian

Hesychius of Miletus (Greek: Ἡσύχιος ὁ Μιλήσιος, romanized: Hesychios o Milesios), Greek chronicler and biographer, surnamed Illustrius, son of an advocate, lived in Constantinople in the 6th century AD during the reign of Justinian. His writings contain more references to pagan Greek culture than Christianity, but his actual religion remains a matter of dispute among scholars.

According to Photius (cod. 69) he was the author of three important works:

1. A Compendium of Universal History in six books, from Belus, the reputed founder of the Assyrian empire, to Anastasius I (d. 518). A considerable fragment has been preserved from the sixth book, a history of Byzantium from its earliest beginnings until the time of Constantine the Great.
2. A Biographical Dictionary of Learned Men, arranged according to classes (poets, philosophers), the chief sources of which were the works of Aelius Dionysius and of Herennius Philo. Much of it has been incorporated in the Suda, as we learn from that book. It is disputed, however, whether the words in the Suda ("of which this book is an epitome") mean that Suda's compiler himself epitomized the work of Hesychius, or whether they are part of the title of an already epitomized Hesychius used in the compilation of the Suda. The second view is more generally held. The epitome referred to, in which alphabetical order was substituted for arrangement in classes and some articles on Christian writers added as a concession to the times, is assigned from internal indications to the years 829-837. Both it and the original work are lost, with the exception of the excerpts in Photius and the Suda. A smaller compilation, chiefly from Diogenes Laërtius and the Suda, with a similar title, is the work of an unknown author of the 11th or 12th century.
3. A History of the Reign of Justin I (518–527) and the early years of Justinian, completely lost.

In 1663, Gilles Ménage published an anonymous Vita Aristotelis that is commonly attributed to Hesychius.

Photius praised the style of Hesychius, and credited him with being a veracious historian.

Editions; J. C. Orelli (1820) and J. Flach (1882); fragments in Karl Wilhelm Ludwig Müller, Fragmenta Historicorum Graecorum iv. 143 and in Theodor Preger's Scriptores originis Constantinopolitanae, i. (1901); Pseudo-Hesychius, by J Flach (1880).
