= Heurtley =

Heurtley is a surname. Notable people with the surname include:

- Charles Abel Heurtley (1806–1895), English theologian
- Walter Abel Heurtley (1882–1955), English archaeologist

== See also ==
- Arthur Heurtley House
