= Phyllis Gardner (British writer) =

British writer and artist (1890–1939)

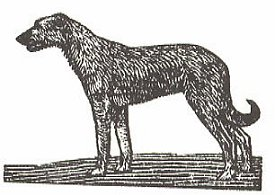
A 1931 woodcut by Phyllis Gardner of Irish Wolfhound "Hy Niall"

Phyllis Gardner (6 October 1890 – 16 February 1939) was a writer, artist, and noted breeder of Irish Wolfhounds. She and Rupert Brooke had, on her side at least, a passionate relationship. She attended the Slade School of Fine Art and was a suffragette when they met. Their conflicting politics, and his conflicted feelings, led the relationship to end.

== Biography ==
Gardner spent some of her early childhood in Athens, where her father, Ernest Arthur Gardner, was Director of the British School of Archaeology. Her aunt Alice Gardner was a historian (of Newnham College) and her uncle, Percy Gardner, was also an archaeologist.

Phyllis Gardner's immediate family - her mother Mary, sister Delphis and brother Christopher - moved according to Professor Gardner's career. On their return to England, they settled in Tadworth, Surrey in a large house called Farm Corner, close to the Surrey Hills.

Gardner attended the progressive Saint Felix School in Southwold, Suffolk between 1907 and 1908. In 1908, Gardner enrolled at the Slade School of Fine Art and specialised in the craft of wood carving, but also had a fondness for drawing and painting animals. She exhibited a screen and wood carvings at the Arts and Crafts Society Eleventh Exhibition in 1916. In later years Phyllis and Delphis carved intricate chess sets, one of which forms part of the Metropolitan Museum collection.

Gardner spotted Rupert Brooke in a tea-room in King's Cross station in 1911 and she, her mother and Brooke shared a train compartment to Cambridge. During the journey, Gardner felt compelled to sketch a likeness of Brooke and upon arrival in Cambridge, Gardner was determined to discover who this young blond-haired man was, and how she could meet him.

After Brooke's death in 1915, Gardner devoted her time to a local hospital which treated soldiers from the front. Gardner found it difficult to cope with the loss of Brooke and found the hospital a welcome distraction. When Brooke's fellow war poet Stanley Casson wrote Brooke and Skyros in 1921, a "quiet essay" on the passing of his friend, Gardner contributed woodcuts to illustrate the book.

Gardner's memoir about her relationship with Brooke along with their letters to one another were deposited by Delphis in the British Library in 1948 and closed to access for 50 years. Due to this lengthy closure, and the secretive way Brooke referred to Gardner in his letters, the importance of their relationship was not acknowledged in 20th century biographies of Brooke, in which Gardner hardly gets a mention at all. According to a 2015 biography, Brooke's letters to Gardner depict a cruel side which his literary executor Edward Marsh tried to hide. Indeed, Brooke's circle felt that Marsh's depiction of an exemplary young man cut down in his prime was a misleading portrayal of a more complex figure.

In later life her family successfully bred Irish Wolfhounds and opened a kennel called Coolafin in Maidenhead. Gardner wrote a well-regarded history of the breed, which she and her sister illustrated.

She died in February 1939 aged 48 from breast cancer.
