= Phyllis Gardner =

Phyllis Gardner may refer to:

- Phyllis Gardner (clinical pharmacologist) (1950–2025), American pharmacologist and academic
- Phyllis Gardner (British writer) (1890–1939), British writer, artist and breeder of Irish Wolfhounds
