= Winifred Lamb =

British art historian (1894–1963)

- Born: 3 November 1894; Campden Hill, London, England
- Died: 16 September 1963 (aged 68); Easebourne, England
- Education: Newnham College, Cambridge
- Employer: Fitzwilliam Museum
- Known for: Honorary Keeper of Greek Antiquities; archaeologist working in Greece and Turkey

Winifred Lamb (3 November 1894 – 16 September 1963) was a British archaeologist, art historian, and museum curator who specialised in Greek, Roman, and Anatolian cultures and artefacts. The bulk of her career was spent as the honorary keeper (curator) of Greek antiquities at the University of Cambridge's Fitzwilliam Museum from 1920 to 1958, and the Fitzwilliam Museum states that she was a "generous benefactor ... raising the profile of the collections through groundbreaking research, acquisitions and publications."

She directed archaeological excavations in Greece and Turkey; was a founding member of the British Institute of Archaeology at Ankara; and was the author of numerous books on Greek and Roman antiquities, including the 1929 publication Greek and Roman Bronzes, which was standard reading for studies on the subject.

== Early life and education ==
Lamb was born on 3 November 1894 at Holly Lodge, Campden Hill, London. She was the daughter of Edmund Lamb, who was a Member of Parliament from 1906 to 1910, and Mabel Lamb (née Winkworth), an alumna of Newnham College, Cambridge, who was active in the promotion of women's university education and women's suffrage. Lamb was educated at home by governesses and tutors, and from 1913 to 1917 attended Newnham, studying Classics with a specialisation in Classical Archaeology, and earning first-class marks (although at this point women could not receive degrees from Cambridge). While a student she participated in archaeological fieldwork at prehistoric sites near Cambridge led by Thomas McKenny Hughes; she was also active in politics, attending meetings of the Union of Democratic Control, a left-wing group opposed to militarism.

== Intelligence work during World War I ==
After completing her studies in the summer of 1917, Lamb worked in a hospital for soldiers. In January 1918, she joined 'Room 40', the cryptanalysis section of the British Naval Intelligence Department, where she probably worked on the decipherment of coded messages sent to German submarines, leaving after the end of the war, in December 1918. It was here that Lamb met John Beazley, a renowned archaeologist also working in British Intelligence, who encouraged her in her research. During this time she also attended sales of antiquities, publishing an article in the Journal of Hellenic Studies on a collection of vases she purchased in one sale, as well as carrying out some cataloguing work in the British Museum.

== Fitzwilliam Museum ==
Objects donated to the Fitzwilliam Museum by Lamb

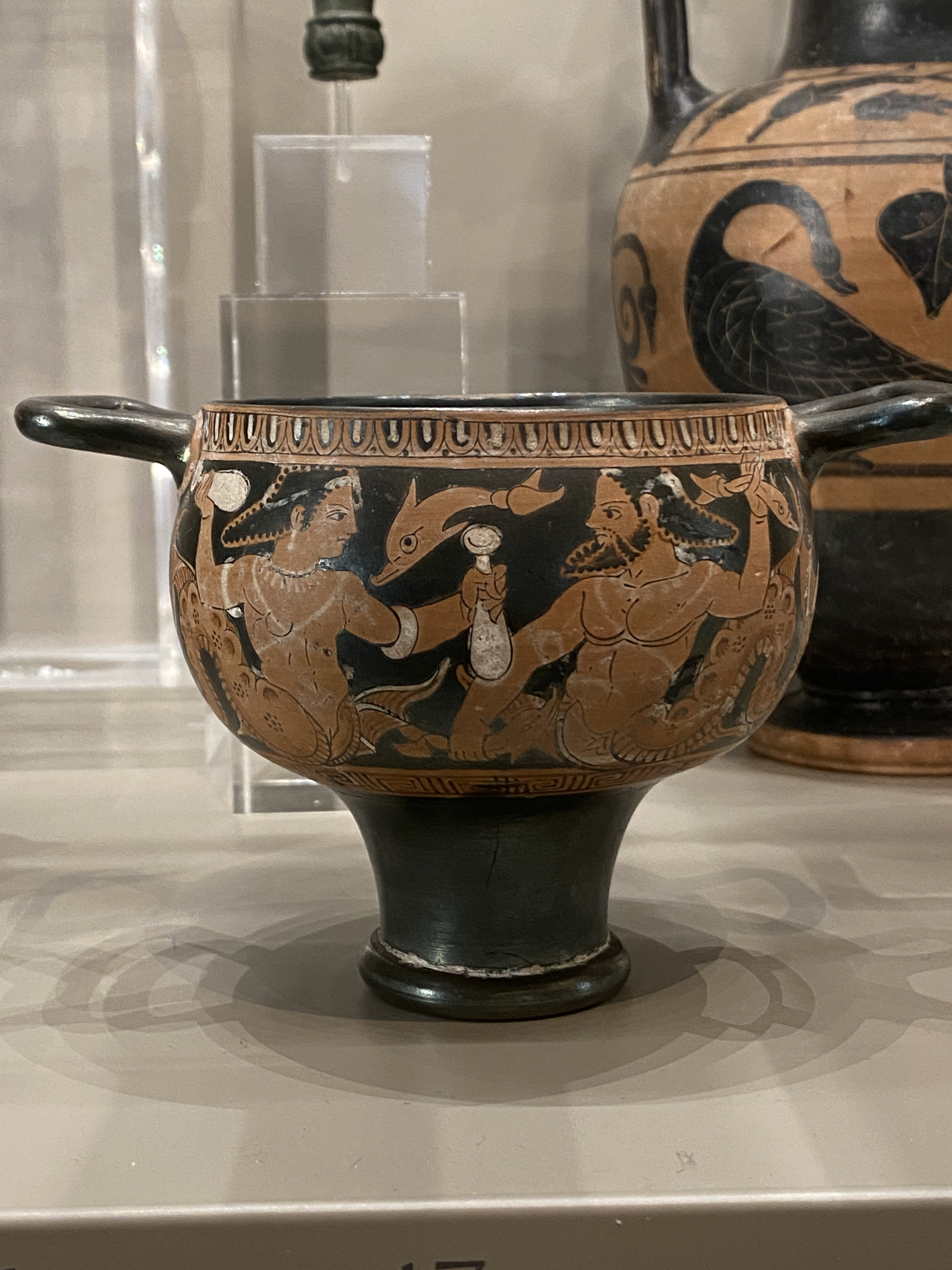
Etruscan skyphos, c. 400 – c. 300 BCE

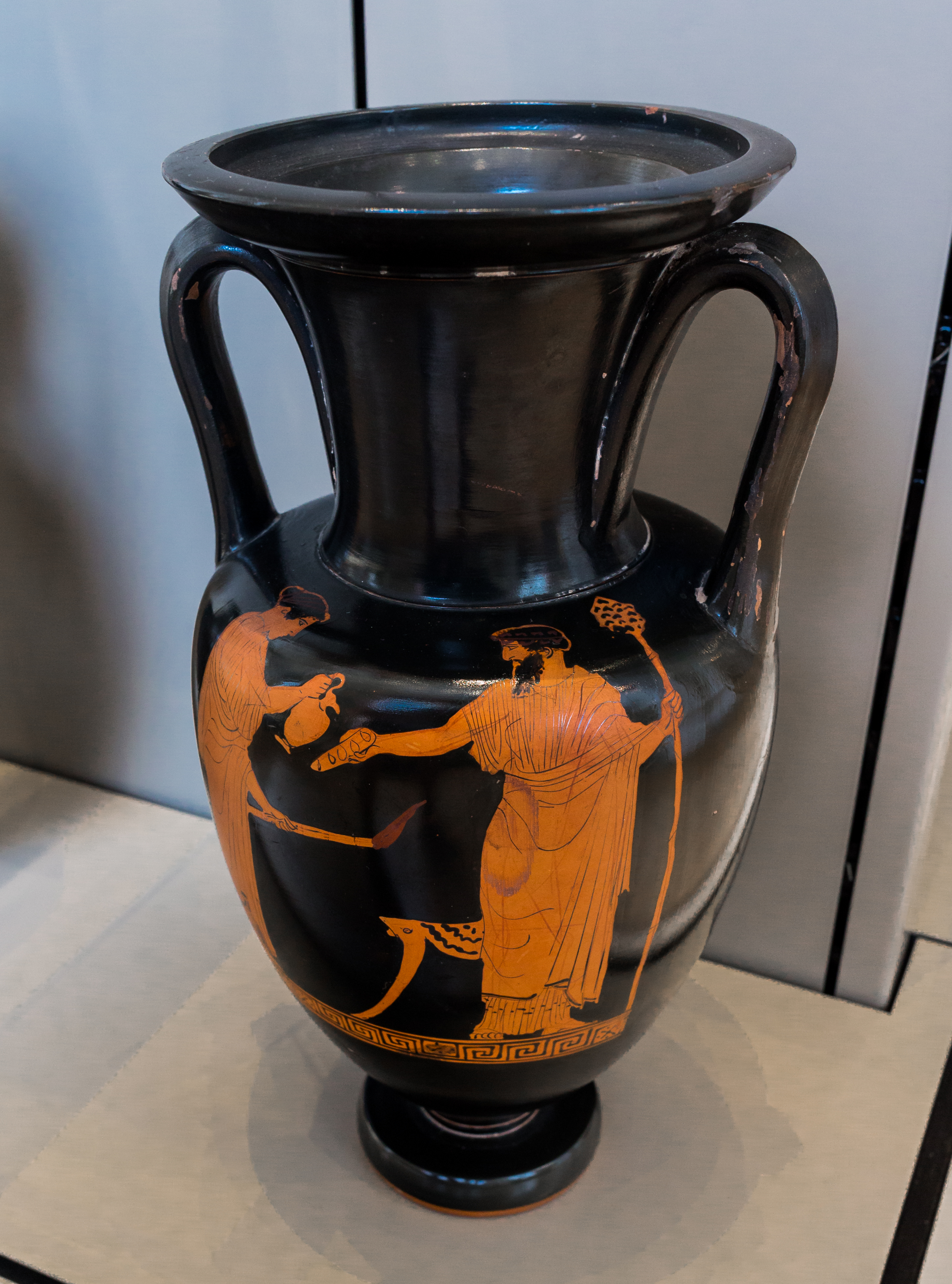
Attic vase showing Dionysos and a maenad, c. 450 BCE

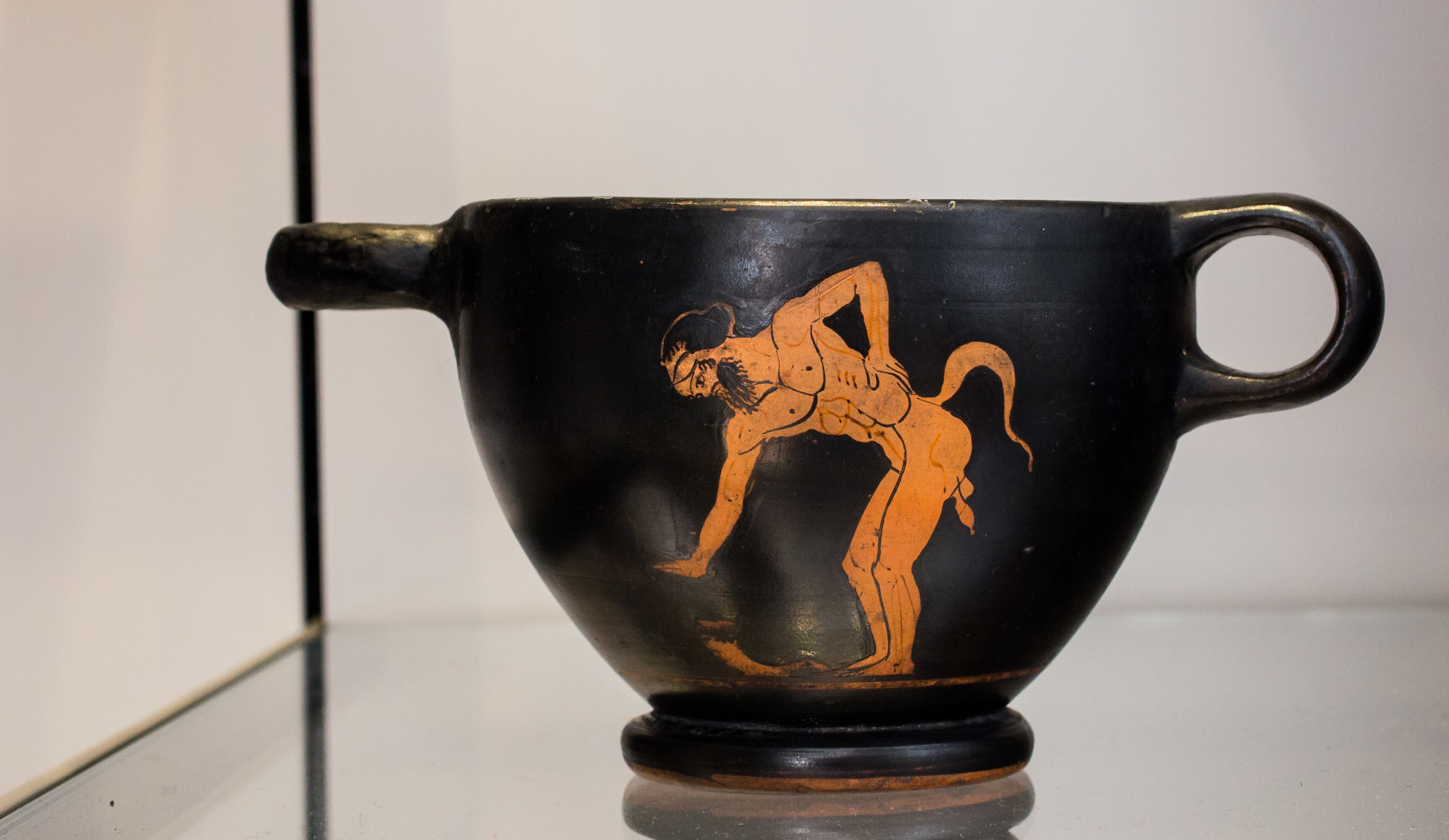
Attic skyphos attributed to the Byrgos Painter, c. 480 BCE

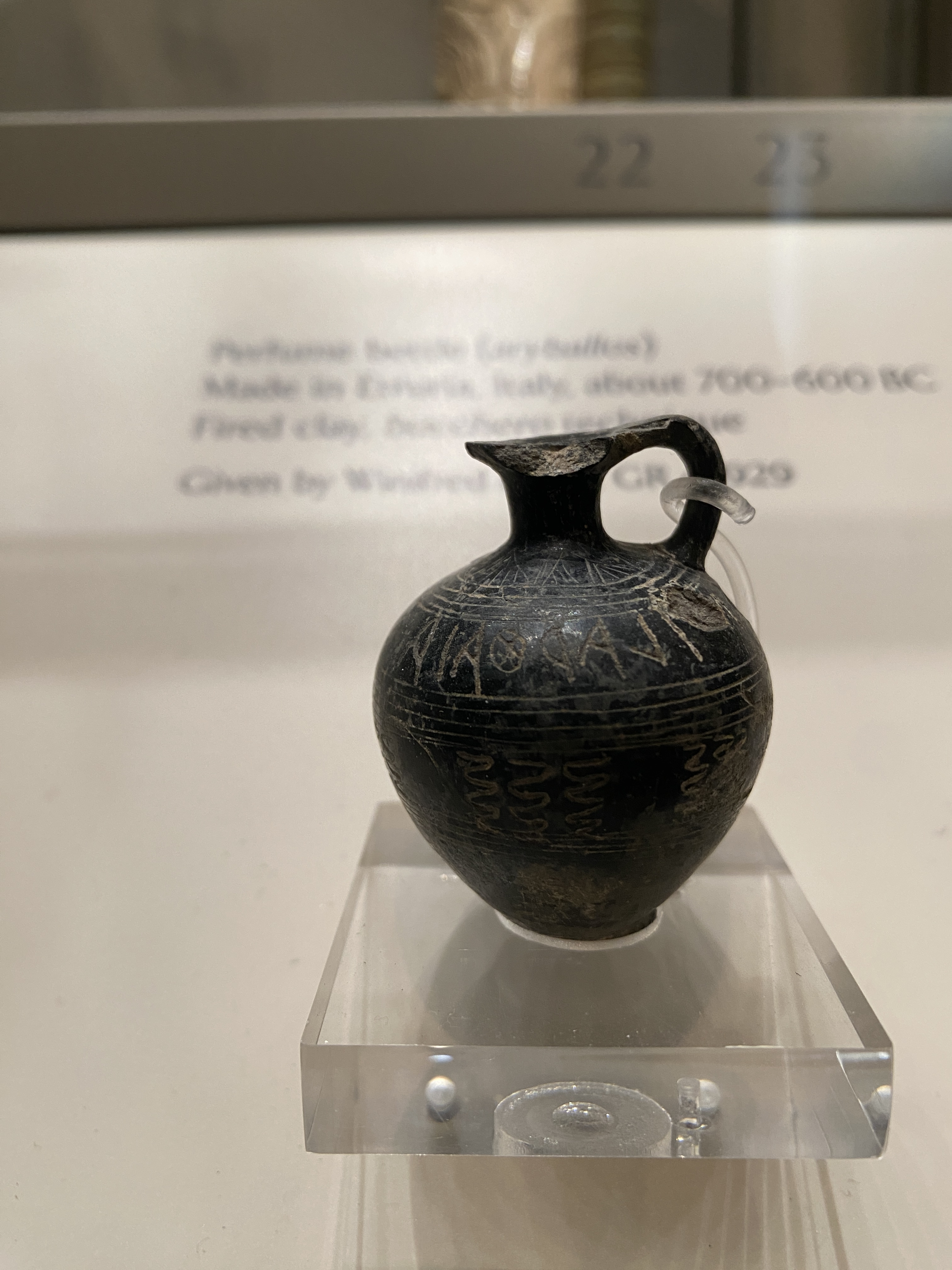
Inscribed Etruscan bucchero jug, c. 700 – c. 600 BCE

Lamb began working at the Department of Greek and Roman Antiquities in the Fitzwilliam Museum in Cambridge in October 1918, at the invitation of Sydney Cockrell: her initial duties included writing labels for items on display. In 1920, she was appointed as Honorary Keeper (Curator) of Greek and Roman Antiquities at the Fitzwilliam; in this position, she arranged new displays (including the creation of displays focusing on prehistoric and Cycladic material), sorted and catalogued the collections, and enhanced them by acquiring new materials through purchases and donations, as well as donating numerous items herself (especially bronzes and pottery). Key publications from her work at the Fitzwilliam include a book on Greek and Roman bronze statues and two volumes of the Corpus Vasorum Antiquorum (Corpus of Ancient Vases). Throughout her time at the Fitzwilliam, Lamb also worked as an archaeologist in Greece and later Turkey. By the time she retired from the role of Honorary Keeper in August 1958, she had become one of the museum's greatest benefactors of Greek and Roman antiquities.

== Excavations in Greece ==
Lamb first visited Greece in May 1920, briefly joining the excavations at Mycenae led by Alan Wace. She was admitted to the British School at Athens as a student for the academic year of 1920–1921, and spent the year visiting archaeological sites in Attica, the Peloponnese, and Crete, attending lectures in the British School and other archaeological schools, and working on the frescoes found at Mycenae. In May 1921 she joined the Mycenae excavation team and was made responsible for the excavation of the palace as well as for the publication of the frescoes. In the next excavation season, May–June 1922, Lamb was appointed as second-in-command of the dig, with particular responsibility for excavating the tombs near the settlement (including the tholos Tomb of Aegisthus) and co-authored many of the excavation reports with Wace.

Lamb next joined the British School's excavation at Sparta in spring 1924, and subsequently excavated with Walter Abel Heurtley in northern Greece, at the site of Vardaroftsa near Thessaloniki in 1925 and at Sarátse in 1929. From 1928, she began looking for her own site to direct excavations; her work in northern Greece, with a focus on the links between the southern Balkans, the northern Aegean, and northwest Anatolia, led her to explore the island of Lesbos in the eastern Aegean. After a trial excavation at Methymna, where she found evidence of occupation from at least the seventh century BCE until the Roman period, she and her colleague Richard Wyatt Hutchinson identified prehistoric pottery at the site of Thermi. Lamb led excavations on this site from 1929 to 1933, largely funded at her own expense, discovering a series of prehistoric settlements. She visited the archaeological excavation of Troy in 1930 and 1932, which inspired further work, allowing her to associate Thermi towns IV and V with Troy IIa, and gave a lecture, expanding on these views, as part of the 1936 exhibition at the Royal Academy of Arts on British Archaeological Discoveries in Greece and Crete 1886–1936. Lamb published her results from Thermi as a book in 1936 – for which she was awarded a Doctor of Science degree from Cambridge in 1940, examined by V. Gordon Childe and Carl Blegen – and provided a selection of finds from the dig to the Fitzwilliam Museum's prehistoric gallery. She subsequently conducted excavations at Antissa (1931–33; also on Lesbos), where she discovered prehistoric, archaic, classical, and Hellenistic settlements and burials, and at the archaic sanctuary of Apollo Phanaios at Kato Phano on Chios (1934).

== Excavations in Turkey ==
Lamb's archaeological work on Lesbos had focused on links between Thermi and Troy; after this, she turned her attention to ancient Anatolia (modern Turkey), following in the footsteps of other female archaeologists, including Gertrude Bell, Margaret Hardie, and Dorothy Lamb (no relation), who had excavated there before the war. Lamb selected the site of Kusura, conducting a trial excavation in 1935 with Elinor W. Gardner and full excavations in 1936 and 1937 with James Rivers Barrington Stewart, Eleanor Mary Barrington Stewart, Rachel Maxwell-Hyslop, R.H. Macartney, and Nine Six; as well as excavating the cemetery, finds included a cult site and pottery relating to Troy VI. Lamb presented her findings in a lecture to the Society of Antiquaries in London on 'Recent developments in the prehistory of Anatolia' in 1937, pointing out Kusura's location on a major Bronze Age route between central Anatolia and the Aegean. A second lecture to the Society of Antiquaries in 1938 similarly emphasized Kusura's relationships with both of these areas. Lamb also published the Anatolian material held by the Fitzwilliam Museum. She felt that more excavation was required in Anatolia, but her work was interrupted by the outbreak of World War II.

Lamb was a founding member of the British Institute of Archaeology at Ankara, whose creation was initiated in 1946 by John Garstang, and served as its honorary secretary from its formal opening in 1948 until 1957, when she resigned from this role and took on the position of vice president. Her work for the BIAA included a programme for the BBC on the Institute and Turkish archaeology, broadcast shortly after the BIAA's creation in 1948; a review of the development of Anatolian archaeology, especially work published in Turkish and German; and a project on the cultures of north-eastern Anatolia in the third millennium BCE, conducted at Erzurum and Trabzon in 1952 and published in 1954.

== BBC work during World War II ==
The Greek Department has on show
Statues collected long ago
And rather bad. So turn from these
And view our small antiquities:
The cups that held Athenian wine
With dainty pictures, neat and fine;
Lady from Crete in adoration
(But with a tarnished reputation)
Bronzes superbly patinated
And each one accurately dated!
Products of Rhodes and Thessaly
And colonies across the sea.
And when you're tired of Greece and Rome
Buy picture cards, and study them at home.

— Poem by Lamb, written in 1947 and hung on the wall of one of the Fitzwilliam's conservation laboratories.

In late 1941 Lamb joined the BBC's European Intelligence Unit as a Greek language supervisor, and she was probably responsible for an intelligence report of 17 November 1941 relating to BBC broadcasts to Greece and the Greek resistance to the German occupation. In January 1942 she transferred to the Near Eastern Department's Turkish section, where she continued to work until 1946: her responsibilities included preparing bi-monthly intelligence reports on Turkish radio services and newspapers, and briefing Turkish journalists based in London; she also worked on reports relating to Iran and Arabic-speaking countries. In October 1944 Lamb was seriously injured when a V2 rocket hit her lodgings in north London and required a long period of recuperation, returning to work in late April 1945. Following the end of the war, she resigned from the BBC in February 1946.

== Later life ==
Lamb retired from her post at the Fitzwilliam Museum in 1958, having become one of the museum's greatest benefactors of Greek and Roman antiquities. She continued to be involved with the British Institute of Archaeology at Ankara, but from 1959 her health deteriorated, often preventing her from attending meetings of the institute. She died of a stroke on 16 September 1963 in the Cottage Hospital at Easebourne.

== Selected publications ==
=== Books ===
- Greek and Roman Bronzes (Argonaut, 1929)
- Corpus Vasorum Antiquorum: Great Britain. Cambridge – Fitzwilliam Museum I & II (Oxford University Press, 1930 & 1936)
- Excavations at Thermi in Lesbos (Cambridge University Press, 1936)

=== Articles ===
- 'Some Vases from the Hope Collection', Journal of Hellenic Studies 38 (1918), pp. 27–36
- 'Excavations at Mycenae III: The Frescoes from the Ramp House', Annual of the British School at Athens 24 (1921), pp. 189–99
- 'Excavations at Mycenae § VIII.—The Palace, Annual of the British School at Athens 25 (1923), pp. 147–282 (with A. Wace & L. Holland)
- 'Stamped Pithos Fragments in the Collection of the British School', Annual of the British School at Athens 26 (1925), pp. 72–77
- 'Arcadian Bronze Statuettes', Annual of the British School at Athens 27 (1926), pp. 133–48
- 'Excavations at Sparta, 1906–1910: 6. Notes on some Bronzes from the Orthia Site' ,Annual of the British School at Athens 28 (1927), pp. 96–106
- 'Excavations at Sparta, 1927: 5. Bronzes from the Acropolis, 1924–1927', Annual of the British School at Athens 28 (1927), pp. 82–95
- 'Excavations at Thermi on Lesbos', Annual of the British School at Athens 30 (1930), pp. 1–52 (with R.W. Hutchinson)
- 'Excavations at Thermi', Annual of the British School at Athens 31 (1931), pp. 148–65 (with J.K. Brock)
- 'Antissa', Annual of the British School at Athens 31 (1931), pp. 166–178
- 'Antissa', Annual of the British School at Athens 32 (1932), pp. 41–67
- 'Grey Wares from Lesbos', Journal of Hellenic Studies 52 (1932), pp. 1–12
- 'Schliemann's Prehistoric Sites in the Troad', Prähistorische Zeitschrift 23 (1932), pp. 111–31
- 'The Site of Troy', Antiquity 6:21 (1932), pp. 71–81
- 'Excavations at Kato Phana in Chios', Annual of the British School at Athens 35 (1935), pp. 138–64
- 'Excavations at Kusura near Afyon Karahisar', Archaeologia 86 (1937), pp. 1–64
- 'Excavations at Kusura near Afyon Karahisar II', Archaeologia 87 (1938), pp. 217–273
- 'Report on the Lesbos Charcoals', Annual of the British School at Athens 39 (1939), pp. 88–89 (with H. Bancroft)
- 'Sigillata from Lesbos', Journal of Hellenic Studies 60 (1940), pp. 96–98 (with F.N. Pryce)
- 'New Developments in Early Anatolian Archaeology', IRAQ 11:2 (1949), pp. 188–293
- 'Face-Urns and Kindred Types in Anatolia', Annual of the British School at Athens 46 (1951), pp. 75–80
- 'The Culture of North-East Anatolia and its Neighbours', Anatolian Studies 4 (1954), pp. 21–32
- 'Some Early Anatolian Shrines', Anatolian Studies 6 (1956), pp. 87–94

== Sources ==
- Biography: David W.J. Gill (2018), Winifred Lamb: Aegean Prehistorian and Museum Curator (Archaeopress, Oxford)
- David W.J. Gill (1998), 'Winifred Lamb and the Fitzwilliam Museum', in C. Stray (ed.), Classics in 19th and 20th Century Cambridge: Curriculum, Culture and Community (Cambridge Philological Society, Cambridge), pp. 135–156
- Dictionary of Art Historians entry
- Oxford Dictionary of National Biography entry
