= Walter Abel Heurtley =

British archaeologist (1882–1955)

Walter Abel Heurtley OBE FSA
- Photographed during the excavation of Chauchitza in Macedonia, 1921
- Born: 24 October 1882; Ashington, Sussex
- Died: 2 January 1955 (aged 72); Dublin
- Occupation: Classical archaeologist
- Spouse: Eileen Mary O'Connell (m. 1914)
- Family: Charles Abel Heurtley (grandfather)
- Awards: Order of the Redeemer; Order of St. Sava

Academic background
- Education: Uppingham School; Gonville and Caius College, Cambridge; Oriel College, Oxford

Academic work
- Institutions: British School at Athens; Department of Antiquities (Mandatory Palestine)
- Military career
- Allegiance: United Kingdom
- Branch: British Army
- Rank: Temporary Major
- Units: Royal Engineers; East Lancashire Regiment
- Wars: First World War

Walter Abel Heurtley OBE FSA (24 October 1882 – 2 January 1955) was a British classical archaeologist. The son of a Church of England vicar, he was educated at Uppingham School and read classics at Gonville and Caius College, Cambridge, on a scholarship. Upon leaving Cambridge, he worked as a teacher at The Oratory School, and became a reserve officer in the Royal Engineers. He served in the East Lancashire Regiment during the First World War, where he was mentioned in despatches three times and acted as deputy governor of the British military prison at Salonika in Greece.

After the war, Heurtley studied classical archaeology at Oriel College, Oxford, under Percy Gardner and with Stanley Casson, the assistant director of the British School at Athens (BSA). Heurtley followed Casson to the BSA, excavating in 1921 with him in Macedonia, and with the school's director, Alan Wace, at Mycenae. In 1923, Heurtley succeeded Casson as the BSA's assistant director, and also assumed the role of its librarian; he held both posts until his dismissal, on financial grounds, in 1932. He subsequently became the librarian of the Department of Antiquities of the Mandate for Palestine, a position he held until 1939, and ended his career as bursar of The Oratory School.

Heurtley was elected as a fellow of the Society of Antiquaries in 1936. He excavated widely in northern Greece during the 1920s and 1930s, and published his monograph, Prehistoric Macedonia, in 1939. He also excavated on the island of Ithaca between 1930 and 1932, and spent a season at Troy under Carl Blegen in 1932. He was often accompanied on his excavations by his wife, Eileen, who cooked for his excavators. He retired to her ancestral home in County Kerry in 1945, and died of cancer in 1955.

== Early life and education ==
Walter Abel Heurtley was born on 24 October 1882, in Ashington in Sussex. His mother was Mary Elizabeth Heurtley (née Brown). His father was Charles Abel Heurtley, a Church of England vicar at Ashington, a descendant of French Huguenots, and the son of the theologian and Oxford professor Charles Abel Heurtley.

Heurtley was educated at Uppingham School, a public school in Rutland, and won a scholarship from there to read classics at Gonville and Caius College, Cambridge. He matriculated on 1 October 1902, and graduated with a second in 1905. He joined the part-time Volunteer Force of the British Army in 1906, as a second lieutenant in the Royal Engineers. From 1907, Heurtley taught at The Oratory School, a Roman Catholic boarding school then based in Birmingham.

During the First World War, Heurtley joined the East Lancashire Regiment and served in Macedonia. On 21 November 1914, he was made a temporary lieutenant in the regiment's ninth battalion. He rose to the rank of temporary major, was mentioned in despatches three times, and was made an Officer of the Order of the British Empire in 1919 for his service, from May 1917, as deputy governor of the British military prison at Salonika in Greece. (Note: Hood 1998, p. 147. For the date of Heurtley's appointment, see Supplement to the London Gazette, 23 July 1917, p. 7470; for that of his OBE, see Supplement to the London Gazette, 3 June 1919, p. 6949.) According to A. W. Lawrence, who later knew Heurtley at the British School at Athens (BSA), he first acquired an interest in archaeology during his time in Salonika. He relinquished the post of deputy governor in February 1919.

== Archaeological career ==
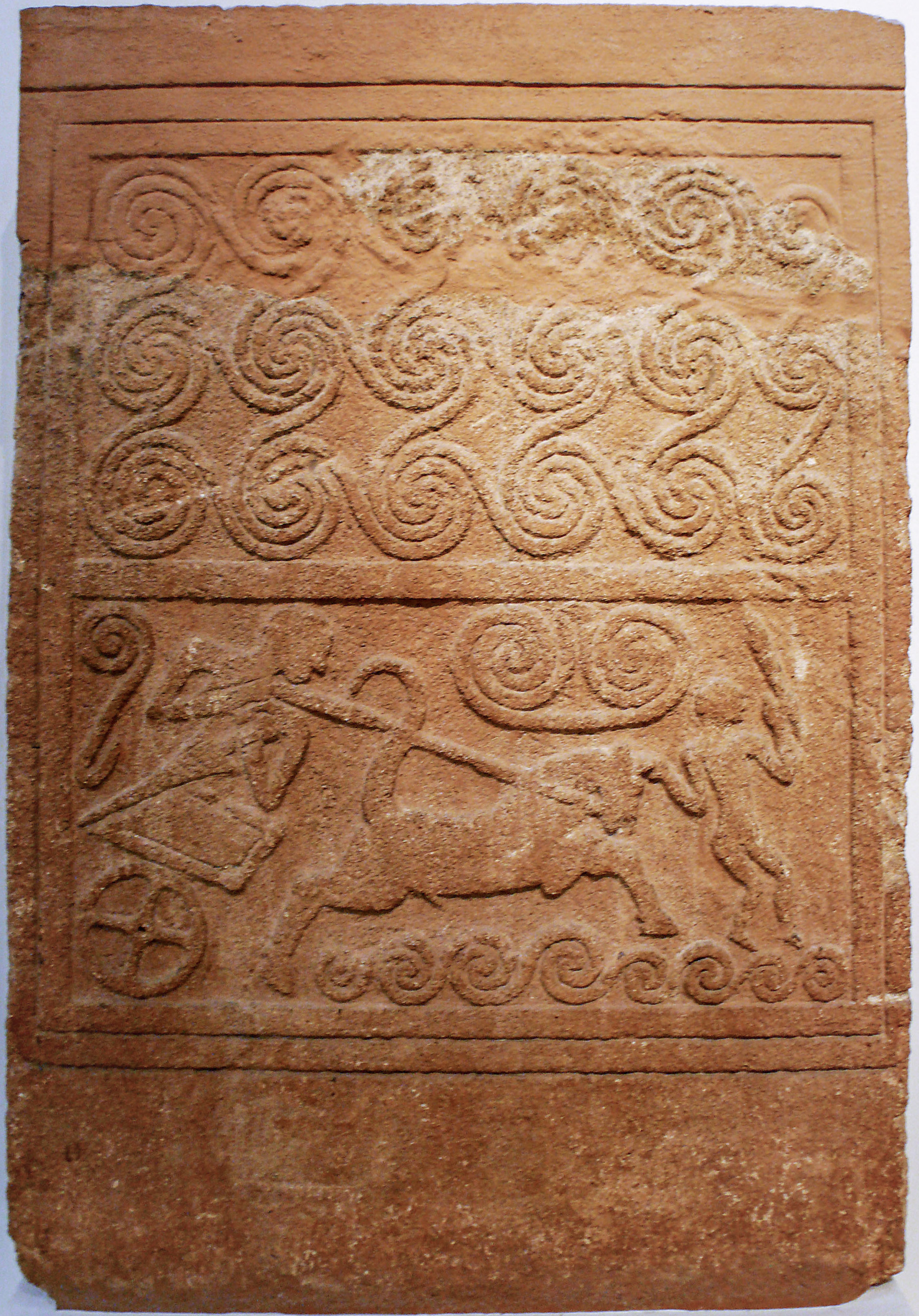
A stele from Grave Circle A, Mycenae. Heurtley excavated at Mycenae under Alan Wace in 1921 and published on the stelai from the site.

After the war, Heurtley moved to Oriel College, Oxford, to take a diploma in classical archaeology, studying under Percy Gardner and with Stanley Casson, the assistant director of the BSA and another former officer of the East Lancashire Regiment. (Note: Gill 2004, p. 451; Gill 2018, p. 123. For Casson's wartime service, see Myres 1945, p. 1. For Heurtley's college, see Oxford University Gazette 1921, p. 359.) Heurtley joined the BSA in 1921 on an Oxford studentship. He excavated in Macedonia with Casson in the spring of that year, at the site of Chauchitza, which had been discovered and hastily studied in December 1917 during the construction of wartime dugouts. Later in 1921, he joined the excavations of the BSA's director, Alan Wace, at the Bronze Age site of Mycenae. At Mycenae, Heurtley worked alongside Winifred Lamb, a curator from Cambridge's Fitzwilliam Museum. Heurtley was tasked with preparing the initial scholarly publication of the stelai found in the prehistoric cemetery designated Grave Circle A.

Oxford University's Craven Committee awarded Heurtley a grant to carry out excavations in Macedonia during the 1922–1923 digging season. Towards the end of the summer of 1922, Heurtley made a journey by sailboat from Corinth along the southern coast of Boeotia and Phokis, investigating the trade routes across the Gulf of Corinth during the Mycenaean period: he later published his findings in The Annual of the British School at Athens. He carried out a survey in 1923 with his fellow Craven student William Linsdell Cuttle to find possible excavation sites in western Macedonia and the Chalkidiki peninsula.

Casson resigned as the BSA's assistant director in 1922; (Note: Gill 2018, p. 123. For the date, see Myres 1944, p. 613.) Heurtley was the favoured choice of Wace, who felt that his experience as a schoolmaster and prison governor would be helpful in managing the school's hostel, and that Heurtley's wife Eileen would also be a "great help" in the administration of the school. Heurtley was accordingly given, in 1923, the assistant directorship and the role of librarian, on an annual salary of £200 (equivalent to £10,457 in 2025) and free accommodation in the BSA's hostel. His work at the BSA included organising the school's collection of potsherds and responsibility for the building of a monument to the poet Rupert Brooke on the island of Skyros, where Brooke had died in 1915.

Heurtley continued to excavate in Macedonia until 1931, working at sites including Servia, Kritsana and Amenochori. (Note: Israel Exploration Journal 1956, p. 268; Lamb 1940, pp. 28–29) In June 1924, he excavated a prehistoric toumba (the local name for a tell) in the Vardar valley, near Karasouli. Winifred Lamb joined Heurtley's excavations at the tell of Vardaroftsa near Thessaloniki in March 1925, where the excavation team lived in tents, supported by Heurtley's wife Eileen and her sister, who cooked for them. Eileen Heurtley would accompany and cater for several of her husband's excavations throughout his career. The Vardaroftsa team included Greek-speaking refugees from Ionia, resettled in Greece following the Turkish invasion of their homeland in 1922. Heurtley returned to Vardaroftsa with a smaller team, consisting of Richard Wyatt Hutchinson and William Linsdell Cuttle, in March 1926.

Among Heurtley's excavators in the 1927–1928 season in the Chalkidiki was Sylvia Benton, then a student at the BSA, who later worked with him at several Macedonian sites and at Ithaca: the archaeologist Catherine Morgan describes her as Heurtley's "protégé". In the spring of 1928, Heurtley excavated with Ralegh Radford as his assistant director at Hagios Mamas and Molyvopyrgo in the Chalkidiki, directing four students of the BSA including John Pendlebury. (Note: Pendlebury criticised Heurtley's approach to excavation, claiming that he had "destroyed a fine prehistoric site containing just what everyone wanted to know in the way of stratification", accusing him of being "merely out for what will look well in a museum", and of conducting "probably the worst dig in history".) Heurtley subsequently worked at Sarátse, alongside Lamb and Benton, in March 1929. In 1930, he excavated tholos tombs at Marmariani in Thessaly, alongside Theodore Cressy Skeat, then a student at the BSA. In the same year, he worked at Vinča-Belo Brdo in Yugoslavia, under the site's discoverer, Miloje Vasić, and on his own excavations at Ithaca, which he conducted from August to October with funding from the diplomat, poet and politician Rennell Rodd. He continued to dig at Ithaca until 1932.

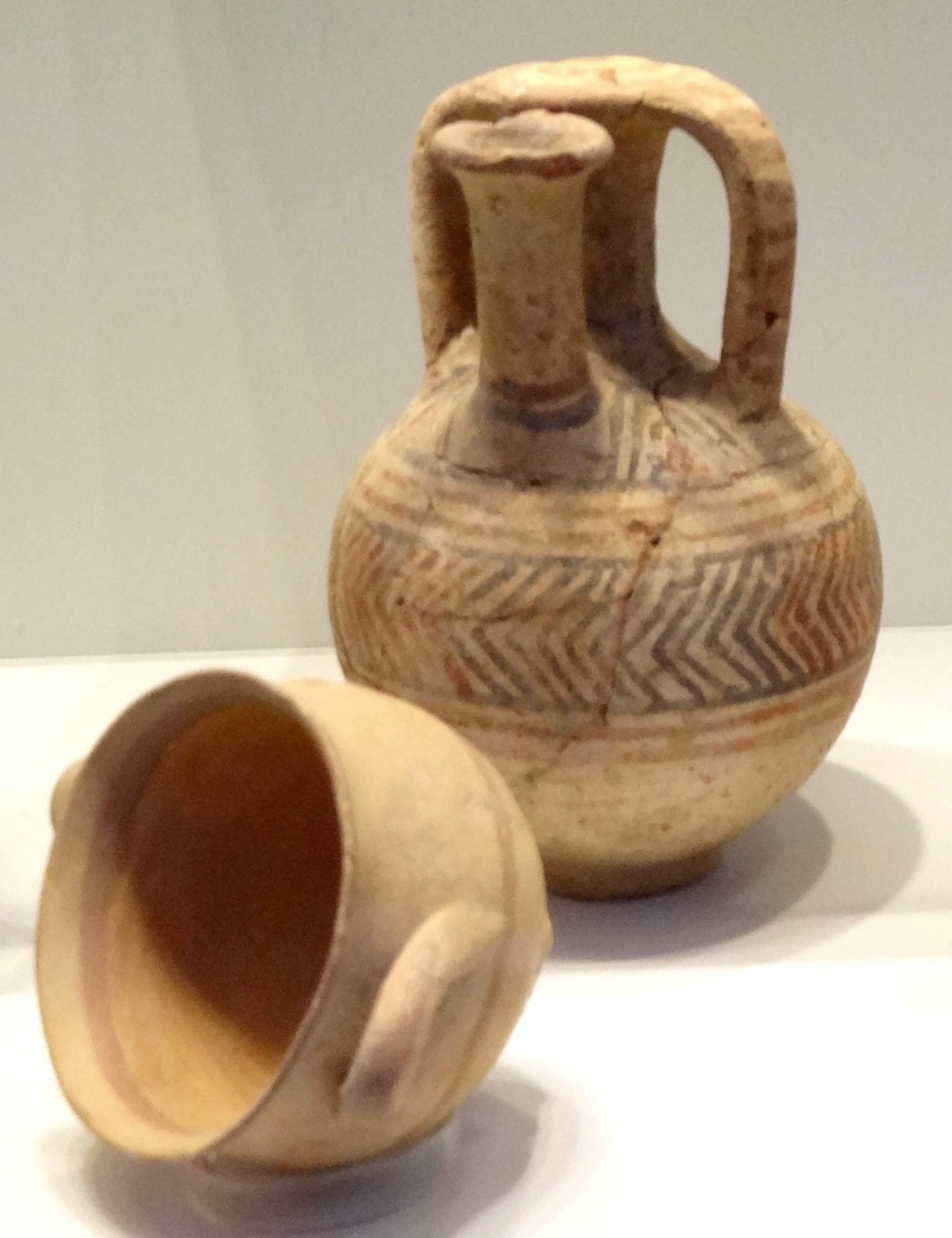
A Philistine bowl and stirrup jar. Heurtley believed that Philistine vessels like these were manufactured in imitation of Mycenaean pottery.

The BSA announced in November 1931 that Heurtley's position as assistant director would be abolished, owing to financial constraints brought on by the Greek economic crisis of the early 1930s. His employment continued until the end of the summer excavation season in 1932; Heurtley worked that season at Troy, under the American archaeologist Carl Blegen. In 1933, he took a post with the British School of Archaeology at Jerusalem and was appointed as librarian of the Department of Antiquities of the Mandate for Palestine, a position he held until 1939. His assistant in the library was the Palestinian intellectual Stephan Hanna Stephan. Heurtley also edited the quarterly journal of the Department of Antiquities. While in Palestine, Heurtley researched Philistine material culture; he argued that Philistine pottery had been manufactured in Palestine to satisfy a demand for Mycenaean-style wares among incomers displaced from the Aegean by the Late Bronze Age collapse.

Heurtley left Palestine in 1939, and was bursar of The Oratory School, by then based in Oxfordshire, during the Second World War. Following the publication of his 1939 monograph, Prehistoric Macedonia, he was awarded a doctor of letters degree by Cambridge University in 1940. (Note: Annual Report of the Managing Committee, British School at Athens, 1950, p. 19 – via Google Books. For the date, see Gill 2004, p. 452.) He retired in 1945, and moved to his wife's ancestral home of Derrynane House in County Kerry, Ireland. Derrynane had been the home of Daniel O'Connell, the nineteenth-century Irish Catholic leader known as "the Liberator", who was Eileen Heurtley's great-grandfather.

== Personal life, honours and death ==
Heurtley's elder brother, Archibald Charles, was born in 1872 and went up to Christ Church, Oxford, to read classics in 1890; another brother, Claud, was born in 1874. Shortly before the First World War, Heurtley travelled to County Kerry to study the Irish language, where he met Eileen Mary O'Connell; the two married in 1914. They had no children. Heurtley converted to Catholicism, his wife's religion: he was later accused of doing so in order to marry her, but explained his decision as a result of being impressed by the beauty of the Baroque churches of Austria, where he had holidayed before the First World War. When publishing the results of his excavations at Ithaca, Heurtley insisted that the word "Madonna" be removed from the description of an ivory figurine of a monkey found at the site.

Heurtley travelled widely, both with Eileen and alone, and generally spent his summer holidays visiting museums and archaeological sites in Eastern Europe. These journeys provided material for his 1939 monograph Prehistoric Macedonia, still considered current by Heurtley's biographer, Rachel Hood, in 1998. Eileen Heurtley went with her husband on one journey through the Erymanthos Valley to Sparta, mostly without the aid of modern roads, though he ascended Mount Olympus and Mount Smolikas without her.

In 1925, Heurtley was awarded the Order of the Redeemer, Greece's highest order of merit. He also received the Order of St. Sava from Yugoslavia in 1931. He was elected as a fellow of the Society of Antiquaries of London in 1936, and was also made a fellow of the German Archaeological Institute and an honorary citizen of Stavros on Ithaca. He suffered from bouts of malaria, the first in 1924, and died of cancer in Dublin on 2 January 1955.

== Selected works ==
=== As sole author ===
- Heurtley, Walter Abel (1925a). "Notes on the Harbours of S. Boeotia, and Sea-Trade between Boeotia and Corinth in Prehistoric Times". Annual of the British School at Athens. 26: 38–45. doi:10.1017/S0068245400010546. JSTOR 30096546. S2CID 161217619.
- — (1925b). "Pottery from Macedonian Mounds". Annual of the British School at Athens. 26: 30–37. doi:10.1017/S0068245400010534. JSTOR 30096545. S2CID 128409840.
- — (1927). "A Prehistoric Site in Western Macedonia and the Dorian Invasion". Annual of the British School at Athens. 28: 158–194. doi:10.1017/S0068245400011151. JSTOR 30098235. S2CID 163940772.
- — (1927). "Early Iron Age Pottery from Macedonia". The Antiquaries Journal. 7 (1): 44–59. doi:10.1017/S0003581500037100. S2CID 164130319.
- — (1931). "Prehistoric Macedonia: What Has Been and What Remains to Be Done". Man. 31: 216–217. doi:10.2307/2789555. JSTOR 2789555.
- — (1932). "Excavations at Sérvia in Western Macedonia". The Antiquaries Journal. 12 (3): 227–238. doi:10.1017/S0003581500043742. S2CID 163982920.
- — (1934). "Excavations in Ithaca: II". Annual of the British School at Athens. 35: 1–44. doi:10.1017/S0068245400007371. JSTOR 30104418. S2CID 130460863.
- — (1935). "Note on a Palestinian Painted Sherd in Athens". The Quarterly of the Department of Antiquities in Palestine. 4: 179–180 – via Internet Archive.
- — (1935). "Note on Fragments of Two Thessalian Proto-Geometric Vases Found at Tell Abu Hawām". The Quarterly of the Department of Antiquities in Palestine. 4: 181 – via Internet Archive.
- — (1936). "The Relationship Between 'Philistine' and Mycenaean Pottery". The Quarterly of the Department of Antiquities in Palestine. 5: 90–112 – via Google Books.
- — (1939). "Excavations in Ithaca, 1930–35". Annual of the British School at Athens. 40: 1–13. doi:10.1017/S0068245400004834. JSTOR 30096706. S2CID 164172658.
- — (1939). Prehistoric Macedonia: An Archaeological Reconnaissance of Greek Macedonia (West of the Struma) in the Neolithic, Bronze, and Early Iron Ages. Cambridge: Cambridge University Press. OCLC 459304061.
- — (1949). "Reviewed Works: Portrait of Durham Cathedral by G. H. Cook; Cathedrals and How They Were Built by D. H. S. Cranage". Blackfriars. 30 (347): 87–88. doi:10.1017/S1754201400033154. JSTOR 43813568.
- — (1952). "A Sherd from Pelikata, Ithaka". Annual of the British School at Athens. 47: 279. doi:10.1017/S0068245400012399. JSTOR 30096898. S2CID 130895400.

=== As co-author ===
- Heurtley, Walter Abel; Hutchinson, Richard Wyatt (1926). "Report on Excavations at the Toumba and Tables of Vardaróftsa, Macedonia, 1925, 1926: Part I. The Toumba". Annual of the British School at Athens. 27: 1–66. doi:10.1017/S0068245400010820. JSTOR 30096568. S2CID 131422568.
- Heurtley, Walter Abel; Radford, Courtney Arthur Ralegh (1928). "Two Prehistoric Sites in Chalcidice". Annual of the British School at Athens. 29: 117–186. doi:10.1017/S0068245400011345. JSTOR 30097142. S2CID 131104229.
- Heurtley, Walter Abel; Radford, Courtney Arthur Ralegh (1929). "Report on Excavations at the Toumba of Saratsé, Macedonia, 1929". Annual of the British School at Athens. 30: 113–150. doi:10.1017/S0068245400011527. JSTOR 30096595. S2CID 164158429.
- Heurtley, Walter Abel; Skeat, Theodore Cressy (1931). "The Tholos Tombs of Marmariane". Annual of the British School at Athens. 31: 1–55. doi:10.1017/S0068245400011679. JSTOR 30096611. S2CID 161685811.
- Heurtley, Walter Abel; Lorimer, Hilda L. (1933). "Excavations in Ithaca, I". Annual of the British School at Athens. 33: 33–65. doi:10.1017/S0068245400011825. JSTOR 30096945. S2CID 246244774.
- Heurtley, Walter Abel; Robertson, Martin (1948). "Excavations in Ithaca, V: The Geometric and Later Finds from Aetos". Annual of the British School at Athens. 43: 1–124. doi:10.1017/S0068245400005633. JSTOR 30104427. S2CID 191476923.
- Heurtley, Walter Abel; Darby, H. Clifford; Crawley, Charles William; Montague Woodhouse, Christopher (1965). A Short History of Greece from Early Times to 1964. Cambridge: Cambridge University Press. OCLC 405331.

== Works cited ==
- "Central Chancery of the Orders of Knighthood". Supplement to the London Gazette. 31373: 6947–6953. 23 July 1917.
- Cheetham, Frank H. (1925). "Excavations in Macedonia". The Antiquaries Journal. 5 (1): 79. doi:10.1017/S0003581500091629. S2CID 162368072.
- Cook, John Manuel (1986). "Sylvia Benton". Annual of the British School at Athens. 81: vi–x. JSTOR 30102886.
- Dothan, Trude Krakauer; Dothan, Moshe (1992). People of the Sea: The Search for the Philistines. New York: Macmillan. ISBN 0025322613 – via Internet Archive.
- Foster, Joseph (1893). Oxford Men and Their Colleges. Oxford and London: Parker & Co. OCLC 707071870.
- Gill, David (2004). "Heurtley, Walter Abel (1882–1955)". In Todd, R. B. (ed.). The Dictionary of British Classicists. Vol. 2. Bristol: Toemmes Continuum. pp. 451–453. ISBN 9781855069978.
- Gill, David (2013). "Cultural Tourism in Greece at a Time of Economic Crisis". Journal of Eastern Mediterranean Archaeology and Heritage Studies. 1 (3): 233–242. doi:10.5325/jeasmedarcherstu.1.3.0233. JSTOR 10.5325/jeasmedarcherstu.1.3.0233. S2CID 154352704.
- Gill, David (2018). Winifred Lamb: Aegean Prehistorian and Museum Curator. Oxford: Archaeopress. ISBN 9781784918804.
- Hood, Rachel (1998). Faces of Archaeology in Greece: Caricatures by Piet de Jong. Oxford: Leopard's Head. ISBN 0904920380.
- Irving, Sarah (2021). "Palestinian Christians in the Mandate Department of Antiquities: History and Archaeology in a Colonial Spaces". In Summerer, Karène Sanchez; Zananiri, Sary (eds.). European Cultural Diplomacy and Arab Christians in Palestine, 1918–1948: Between Contention and Connection. Cham: Palgrave Macmillan. pp. 165–186. doi:10.1007/978-3-030-55540-5. ISBN 9783030555405.
- Lamb, Winifred (1940). "Reviewed Work: Prehistoric Macedonia, by W. A. Heurtley". Man. 40: 28–29. JSTOR 2791569.
- Morgan, Catherine (2017). "The British Salonika Force, the British School at Athens, and the Archaic–Hellenistic Archaeology of Macedonia". In Shapland, Andrew; Stefani, Evangelia (eds.). Archaeology Behind the Battle Lines: The Macedonian Campaign (1915–19) and Its Legacy. Abingdon: Routledge. pp. 121–180. ISBN 9781351978101.
- Myres, John Linton (1944). "Obituary: Lieut-Col Stanley Casson". Nature. 153: 613. doi:10.1038/153613a0.
- Myres, John Linton (1945). "Obituaries: Stanley Casson 1889–1944". Annual of the British School at Athens. 41: 1–4. doi:10.1017/S0068245400004147. JSTOR 30096903.
- "Notes and News". Israel Exploration Journal. 6 (4): 257–270. 1956. JSTOR 27924679.
- "Notices under the Trustee Act, 1925, S. 7". The London Gazette. 40407: 970–986. 15 February 1955.
- Oxford University Gazette, vol. 52, 1921 – via Google Books
- Powell, Dilys (1973). The Villa Ariadne. London: Hodder and Stoughton. ISBN 0340177705.
- "Proceedings of the Society of Antiquaries". The Antiquaries Journal. 35 (3–4): 279–287. 1955. doi:10.1017/S0003581500042141. S2CID 246044480.
- Roberts, Ernest Stewart, ed. (1912). Biographical History of Gonville and Caius College, 1349–1897. Vol. 4, Part 1. Cambridge: Cambridge University Press. OCLC 931129288 – via Internet Archive.
- "Royal Engineers (Volunteers)". The London Gazette. 27978: 8974. 21 December 1906.
- "War Office". Supplement to the London Gazette. 28994: 10277–10288. 3 December 1914.
- "War Office". Supplement to the London Gazette. 30198: 7463–7480. 23 July 1917.
- "War Office". Supplement to the London Gazette. 31500: 10201–10216. 11 August 1919.
