= Lin Foxhall =

Archaeologist and ancient historian

Lin Foxhall FSA, MBE
- Spouse: Hamish Forbes

Academic background
- Education: Bryn Mawr College, University of Pennsylvania, University of Liverpool

Academic work
- Discipline: Archaeology
- Sub-discipline: Ancient Greek History
- Institutions: University of Leicester, University of Liverpool

Lin Foxhall is a Professor of archaeology and ancient Greek History. She has written on women, men, and gender in the classical world. She is an Honorary Professor at the University of Leicester, and holds the Rathbone Chair of Ancient History and Classical Archaeology at the University of Liverpool.

== Career ==
Foxhall studied for her bachelor's degree at Bryn Mawr College. She received her master's degree from the University of Pennsylvania. She was awarded her PhD from the University of Liverpool in 1990 for a thesis entitled, Olive Cultivation Within Greek and Roman Agriculture: The Ancient Economy Revisited. She held a JRF at St Hilda's College, Oxford, and subsequently was a Lecturer in Anthropology and History at UCL, before joining the University of Leicester in 1993, where was made Professor of Greek Archaeology and History in 1999. In 2017, she was appointed to the Rathbone Chair of Ancient History and Classical Archaeology at the University of Liverpool, and was Dean of the School of Histories, Languages and Cultures at the University of Liverpool until 2021. She was the Principal Investigator on the 'Tracing Networks' Project, and she is the co-director of the Bova Marina project.

Foxhall was awarded an honorary MBE in 2001 in recognition of her contribution to the Millennium celebrations. As a bell-ringer herself, she created the “Ringing in the Millennium” project in 1996 and was awarded £3 million in National Lottery funding towards the £6 million project. Across the UK over 150 communities benefited from the project, in which new bells were installed and old bells restored. She was Head of Department of Ancient History and Archaeology when the University of Leicester Archaeological Services discovered the bones of Richard III in 2015, and thus played a major role in the University's investigation, co-writing a book about the process with Maev Kennedy.

Foxhall was elected as a Fellow of the Society of Antiquaries of London (FSA) on 5 June 2003.

Foxhall is a member of the editorial board of World Archaeology journal, and was the Editor of Journal of Hellenic Studies from 2021 to 2026.

== Publications ==
- "Women's Ritual and Men's Work in Ancient Athens", in Women in Antiquity. New Assessments, edited by Richard Hawley and Barbara Levick (London: Routledge, 1995) ISBN 0-203-42855-2, S. 97–110
- Greek Law in its Political Setting: Justifications not Justice, edited with A. D. E. Lewis (Oxford: Clarendon Press, 1996) ISBN 0-198-14085-1
- Thinking Men: Masculinity and its Self-Representation in the Classical Tradition (= Leicester-Nottingham studies in ancient society. Band 7) edited with John Salmon (London: Routledge, 1998) ISBN 1-134-68698-6
- Olive Cultivation in Ancient Greece: Seeking the Ancient Economy (Oxford: Wiley, 2007) ISBN 978-0-191-51841-6
- Gender and the City before Modernity, edited with Gabriele Neher (Chichester: Wiley, 2013) ISBN 978-1-118-23443-3, OCLC 772702909
- Studying Gender in Classical Antiquity (Cambridge: Cambridge University Press, 2013)
- with Maev Kennedy and the Grey Friars Research Team, Bones of a King: Richard III Rediscovered (Chichester, West Sussex, 2015) ISBN 978-1-118-78314-6
