= Ernest Arthur Gardner =

English archaeologist (1862–1939)

Ernest Arthur Gardner (16 March 1862 – 27 November 1939) was an English archaeologist. He was the director of the British School at Athens between 1887 and 1895.

== Early life ==
Gardner was born in Clapton, London, England on 16 March 1862 to Thomas Gardner and Ann Pearse. He was educated at the City of London School, a boys' private day school located in the City of London. He entered Gonville and Caius College, Cambridge in 1880. He read for a Bachelor of Arts (BA) in Classics and graduated with a double first in 1884.

== Career ==
=== Early academic career ===
Gardner became a fellow of Gonville and Caius College in 1885. In 1885 and 1886, as part of the Egypt Exploration Society, he was involved in the excavations at Naucratis, Egypt. He became a student of the British School at Athens under Francis Penrose in 1886. From 1887 to 1895 he was director of the school. During his first term as director, he led excavations at Old Paphos and Salamis in Cyprus. When his directorship was extended in 1891, he led an excavation in Megalopolis, Greece.

After resigning from the British School at Athens in 1895, he took up the position of Yates Professor of Classical Art and Archaeology at the University of London in 1896, and held that position until 1929. He became editor of The Journal of Hellenic Studies in 1897. He was dean of the Faculty of Arts of the University of London from 1905 to 1909 and again from 1913 to 1915. He was elected as the first Public Orator of London University in 1910.

=== Military service ===
At the outbreak of World War I, Gardner was commissioned into the Royal Naval Volunteer Reserve as a lieutenant commander. He served as a naval intelligence officer at Salonika, Greece from 1915 to 1917. While based there, he organised the removal of the area's archaeological remains to the protection of the White Tower of Thessaloniki. For this action, he was awarded the Gold Cross of the Order of the Redeemer in 1918 by the Greeks. In late 1917 he returned to England and joined the Admiralty. He continued his service in naval intelligence until early 1919.

=== Later career and life ===
Gardner resigned from his positions as Public Orator of London University in 1929 and as editor of The Journal of Hellenic Studies in 1932. He was Vice-Chancellor of the University of London between 1924 and 1926. From 1929 to 1932, he was president of the Hellenic Society. He continued lecturing at the University of London until 1933.

Gardner died on 27 November 1939 in Maidenhead, Berkshire, United Kingdom.

== Personal life ==
Gardner married Mary Wilson (died 1936) in 1887. Together they had one son and two daughters. His daughter Phyllis Gardner was a writer and artist, whose relationship with poet Rupert Brooke has come to light with two 2015 publications.

His sister Alice Gardner was a historian and his brother, Percy Gardner, was also an archaeologist.

== Select works ==
His publications include: Introduction to Greek Epigraphy (1887); Ancient Athens (1902); Handbook of Greek Sculpture (1905); Six Greek Sculptors (1910); "Poet and Artist in Greece: With Illustrations" (1933; Japanese translation by Keiji Kokubu available, Sogensha Press, 1944).

== Collections ==
University College London Special Collections holds letters to Gardner from Flinders Petrie.

== See also ==
- List of Vice-Chancellors of the University of London

Academic offices
Preceded by Sir Holburt Jacob Waring Bt CBE FRCS	Vice-Chancellor of the University of London; 1924–1926	Succeeded by The Baron Beveridge PC KCB
