= Hannah Elizabeth Pipe =

British headmistress

- Born: 27 November 1831; Manchester
- Died: 29 December 1906 (aged 75); Limpsfield
- Education: Chorlton high school
- Occupation: headteacher
- Known for: girl's education
- Successor: Misses Swindells

Hannah Elizabeth Pipe (27 November 1831 – 29 December 1906) was a British headmistress.

== Life ==
Pipe was born in Manchester in 1831. Her parents were Susanna (born Spencer) and William Pipe. Her uncle was John Willson Pipe who like her father, was a Wesleyan preacher. Her father died in 1841 and her mother reopened the family's cutlery shop to make a living. She was an only child and they lived in the Greenhays area of the city. Her education was a priority and she went first to a school run by Charles Cumber before she went on to Chorlton high school where she became a star pupil of the head William Ballantyne Hodgson.

She was encouraged to become a teacher and she opened her own school in 1848 and this made enough money for her to employ her mother as the shop was closed. By 1852 she had moved premises and she was taking in boarders. She was encouraged to move to London and children;s parents agreed. Her Manchester school was replaced by Laleham Boarding School for Girls which was based in Clapham in 1856 offering lessons in art, science and a religious education. Her mother had also moved to London and Pipe taught several subjects herself. There were five bible classes each week and each time she was alone with her charges.

By 1860 the school was in a larger building with twenty five boarders paying 100 guineas each per annum. Pipe considered schools for girls as poor and that the expectation of parents for education for their daughters was unambitious. She employed leading teachers and she had high expectations although she was not keen on examinations.

Ten of her students by 1893 had gone on to Newnham College. Pipe preferred Newnham to Girton as she didn't support Emily Davies' idea that women should take the same courses as men.

Among the students of Hannah Pipe`s school, Laleham, were: Alice Gardner (1854-1927).

== Death and legacy ==
Pipe retired in 1890 (or 1900) and died at her home in Limpsfield in 1906. Her school operated until 1908. Her life and her letters were published after her death.
