= Stanley Casson =

British classical archaeologist (1889–1944)

Stanley Casson FSA
- As a major during the Second World War
- Born: 1889
- Died: 17 April 1944 (aged 54)
- Resting place: Fairpark cemetery, Newquay
- Spouse: Elizabeth Joan Ruddle (m. 1924)
- Children: 1 (Jennifer)
- Awards: Order of the Redeemer

Academic background
- Education: Ipswich School; Merchant Taylors' School, Northwood; Lincoln College, Oxford; St John's College, Oxford
- Influences: Lewis Richard Farnell; Robert Ranulph Marett

Academic work
- Institutions: New College, Oxford; British School at Athens
- Military career
- Allegiance: United Kingdom
- Branch: British Army
- Rank: Lieutenant colonel
- Units: East Lancashire Regiment; Intelligence Corps
- Conflicts: First World War; Western Front; Macedonian front; Second World War †; German invasion of the Netherlands; Greco-Italian War; German invasion of Greece; Battle of Crete
- Awards: Mentioned in despatches
- Espionage activity
- Allegiance: United Kingdom
- Agency: Special Operations Executive

Stanley Casson FSA (1889 – 17 April 1944) was an English classical archaeologist. He published widely on the history, culture, art and archaeology of Greece, and conducted excavations in Greece and in Constantinople. He served as a staff officer during the First World War and in military intelligence during the Second World War.

Educated at Ipswich School and at Merchant Taylors' School in Hertfordshire, Casson attended Lincoln College, Oxford, on an exhibition, where he studied both archaeology and anthropology. He continued his studies at St John's College, Oxford, and the British School at Athens (BSA), where he pursued a then-unusual interest in modern Greek historical anthropology. During the First World War, he served as an officer in the East Lancashire Regiment, and was wounded on the Western Front in 1915. He subsequently transferred as a staff officer to the Macedonian front under George Milne, where he undertook archaeological excavations at Chauchitza and helped to establish the rules and procedures for heritage protection in the area during wartime. He also served in Turkestan, was one of the first Allied officers to enter Constantinople after the Ottoman surrender of November 1918, and was mentioned in despatches.

Following his demobilisation, Casson became the assistant director of the BSA from 1919 until 1922, took a fellowship in 1920 at New College, Oxford, and lectured widely in person and on BBC radio on archaeological matters. During the inter-war period, he carried out excavations on behalf of the British Academy in the Hippodrome of Constantinople, and held temporary posts at the University of Bristol and at Bowdoin College in the United States. He returned to military service shortly before the outbreak of the Second World War in September 1939, joining the Intelligence Corps as an officer and instructor. He was almost captured during the German invasion of the Netherlands in May 1940, and was subsequently posted to Greece as the chief intelligence officer of No. 27 Military Mission, the British reporting mission to the country. In Greece, he served on the staff of Henry Maitland Wilson and was again almost captured during the Battle of Crete in May 1941. He subsequently joined the Special Operations Executive (SOE), and was serving as the SOE's liaison officer in Greece when he was killed in an aircraft crash on 17 April 1944.

Casson's academic interests and publications were eclectic: outside the archaeology of Classical Greece, he published the earliest major English work on Thrace, and wrote widely on Byzantine art. He published articles in both the scholarly and the popular press, and wrote Murder by Burial, a detective novel with archaeological and anti-fascist themes, in 1938.

== Early life and education ==
Stanley Casson was born in 1889. His parents were William Augustus Casson, a civil servant and barrister, and his wife Kate Elizabeth (née Peake). He attended Ipswich School, a private school in Suffolk, from 1899 until 1901, when he moved to Merchant Taylors' School in Hertfordshire. He subsequently won an exhibition to study at Lincoln College, Oxford, where he matriculated in 1909. He was taught by the classicist Lewis Richard Farnell and the ethnologist Robert Ranulph Marett, who became important influences upon him. Casson began his time at Oxford studying archaeology, but developed an interest in anthropology during his degree, and eventually transferred to studying the subject. He was a founding committee member of Oxford University's anthropology society, and part of the Oxford University Officers' Training Corps.

Casson subsequently received a senior scholarship towards postgraduate study in classics at St John's College, Oxford. In the 1912–1913 academic year, Casson attended the British School at Athens (BSA) on a Craven scholarship. (Note: Myres 1945, p. 1. For the date and the scholarship, see Gill 2011, p. 98. For Casson's subject, see London 2022, p. 24.) Against the then-current trend at the BSA for the study of Aegean prehistory, Casson's studies there focused on the Greek National Awakening of the eighteenth and nineteenth centuries. While at the BSA, he was given responsibility for editing the second volume of the BSA's catalogue of the Acropolis Museum in Athens.

== First World War ==
On 15 August 1914, Casson was commissioned as a second lieutenant in the third battalion of the East Lancashire Regiment. He served briefly on the Western Front, where he was wounded in 1915. He was promoted to lieutenant on 15 May 1915, and sent upon his recovery to the Macedonian front. He was assigned to staff duty on 1 March 1916, and served on the General Staff of George Milne, the commander of British forces in the theatre. During his time in Macedonia, he was a leading figure in the largely ad hoc British archaeological work taking place alongside the military advance, and worked with local Greek officials to establish rules and procedures for excavation and heritage protection in the theatre. In December 1917, he hastily excavated the prehistoric site of Chauchitza, which had been discovered during the construction of military dugouts.

Casson also served in Turkestan, was one of the first Allied officers to enter Constantinople after the Ottoman surrender of November 1918, and was mentioned in despatches. During his service with Milne, he was promoted to temporary captain. Casson later defended the importance of the Macedonian front in his 1935 memoir, Steady Drummer, arguing that the Allied breakthrough there in September 1918 had "opened the way to the Danube and Austria, and so brought about the collapse of the entire opposing front." (Note: Casson 1935, p. 8, quoted in Fantauzzo 2020, p. 200.) He wrote poetry during his wartime service; poems from his notebooks were first published in 2022.

== Inter-war academic career ==
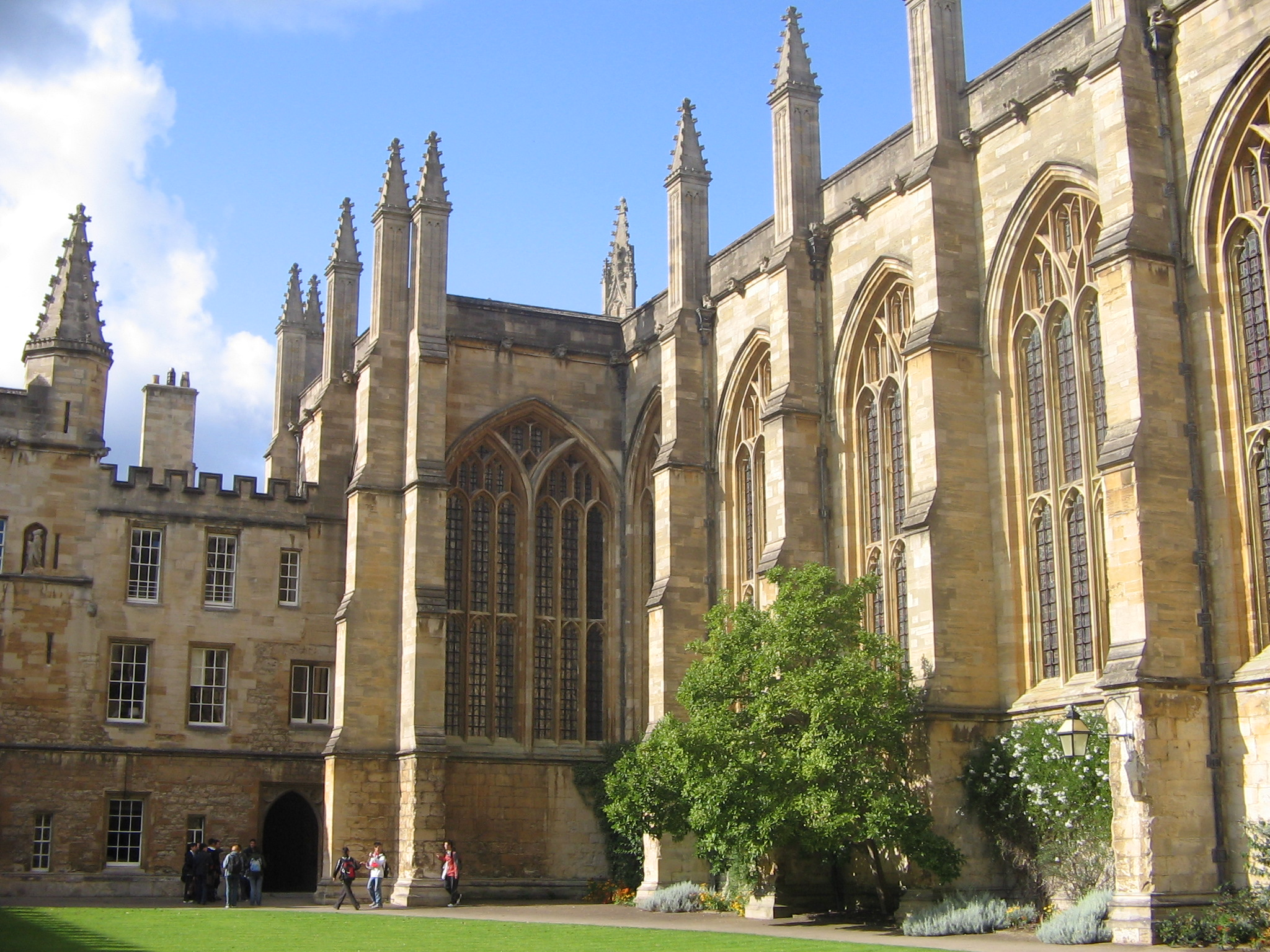
The chapel of New College, Oxford, where Casson was a fellow from 1920

In 1919, Casson became the assistant director of the British School at Athens, a position he held until 1922. While at the British School, Casson began the work of constructing a monument to the poet Rupert Brooke on the island of Skyros, where Brooke had died in 1915. In the spring of 1921, he excavated in Macedonia, alongside Walter Abel Heurtley, at Chauchitza. Casson's volume of the Acropolis Museum catalogue was published in 1921. He resigned from the BSA in 1922, and was succeeded as assistant director by Heurtley. (Note: Hood 1998, p. 147; Gill 2018, p. 123. For the date, see Myres 1944, p. 613.)

In 1920, Casson became a fellow of New College, Oxford, where he lectured in archaeology. He also delivered lectures for Oxford University's Ashmolean Museum, and programmes on archaeology for the BBC. He married Elizabeth Joan Ruddle, the daughter of the brewer George Ruddle, on 9 August 1924, shortly after the death of Casson's father, William. Casson's Macedonia, Thrace and Illyria, a work of historical geography, won the university's Conington Prize in 1924 and was published as a book in 1926. He was the tutor of the archaeologist (and second husband of Agatha Christie) Max Mallowan; Mallowan credited a letter from Casson with securing his acceptance by Leonard Woolley to excavate with him at Ur in 1925.

Casson was promoted to university lecturer in 1927, as the first holder of Oxford's Readership in Classical Archaeology, a post created to support the Lincoln Professor of Classical Archaeology and Art (then John Beazley). (Note: Boardman 1985, p. 52. For Beazley's professorship, see Robertson & Beard 1991, p. xix.) In 1927–1928, he excavated on behalf of the British Academy in the Hippodrome of Constantinople, where he discovered hydraulic channels proving that waterworks had once been built into the track's central divider, and that the Serpent Column and the base of the Walled Obelisk were once converted into fountains. This was the only archaeological fieldwork he undertook during his lectureship at Oxford. In 1928, he served as one of the university's proctors. By 1928, he was a regular archaeological correspondent on BBC radio; he also became the first archaeologist to be featured in the BBC's The Listener magazine, authoring a six-part series on Greek archaeology in March–April 1929. In 1931, he was appointed as a special lecturer in art at the University of Bristol. In the same year, his only child, Jennifer, was born.

During the 1933–1934 academic year, Casson held a visiting professorship at Bowdoin College in Brunswick, Maine, during which he catalogued the objects in the college's Warren Collection. He was funded in his time at Bowdoin by Frank Gifford Tallman, and may have obtained his appointment through his connections to Beazley. In 1938, he published Murder by Burial, a detective novel in which an archaeologist excavating the palace of Cymbeline is murdered by a fascist, Colonel Cackett, who wishes to build a statue of the Roman emperor Claudius on the site. The confrontation between them becomes an allegory for Britain's national identity, its relationship with its Roman past and its relations with Mussolini's fascist Italy: in Shakespeare's play, Cymbeline resists the Roman occupation of Britain. In 1935, he published Steady Drummer, a memoir of his First World War experience called "brilliant and caustic" by Casson's obituarist John Myres. In February 1939, he was considered by the BBC to front a new series of talks on archaeological heritage: he was ultimately passed over, with a note that he was perhaps "too highbrow" entered against his name by the BBC's Vincent Alford.

== Second World War and death ==
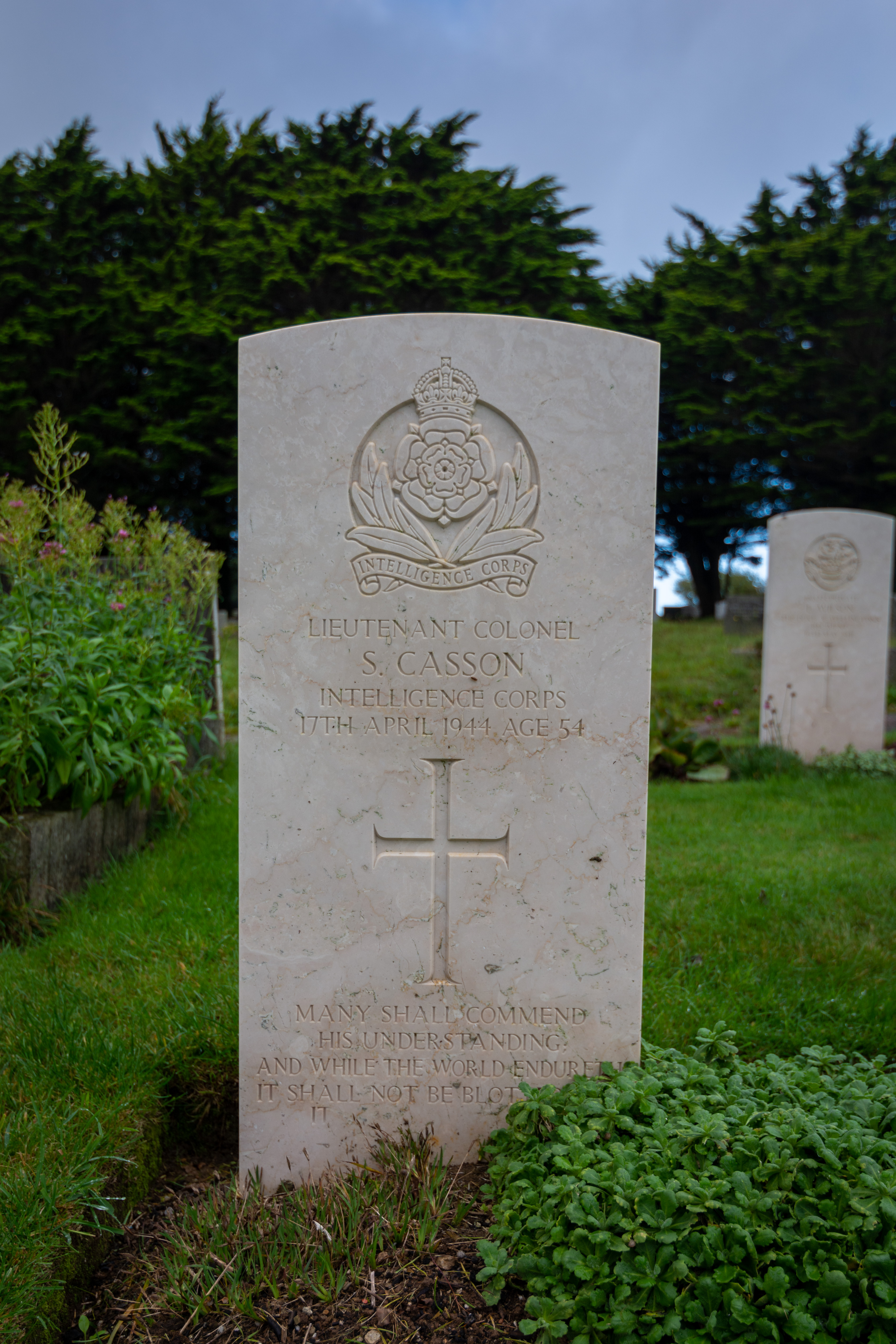
Casson's headstone at Fairpark cemetery in Newquay

Before the outbreak of the Second World War in September 1939, Casson had joined the Army Officers' Emergency Reserve; he was posted to the Intelligence Corps later in 1939. He was in the Netherlands during the German invasion of May 1940, and was almost captured.

In August 1940, Casson was serving as an instructor at the Intelligence Training Centre at Smedley's Hydro in Matlock, Derbyshire, to which newly-commissioned officers of the Intelligence Corps were posted. Following the Italian invasion of Greece in October 1940, the British Chiefs of Staff Middle East formed No. 27 Military Mission to travel to Greece and report on its military situation. Casson was recruited by the mission's commander, Thomas George Gordon Heywood, as its chief intelligence officer. (Note: Higham 2009, p. 41. For the fall of Korçë, see Battistelli 2021, p. 60.) In 1940, he recruited the future author Patrick Leigh Fermor, then serving with the Intelligence Corps and a former student of Casson's at the Intelligence Training Centre, for the mission. In his notebook, Leigh Fermor described Casson as "donnish, witty and slightly disreputable"; Casson spoke to him entirely in Greek. Another of Casson's protégés was his former Oxford archaeology student, the future diplomat David Hunt.

Casson was the first member of No. 27 Military Mission to arrive in Greece, reaching Athens shortly after the fall of the Albanian city of Korçë to the Greek counter-attack on 22 November. (Note: Higham 2009, p. 41. For the fall of Korçë, see Battistelli 2021, p. 60.) He was subsequently attached to the Hellenic Army, and served on the staff of the British Expeditionary Force to Greece (also known as W Force). His relations with Henry Maitland Wilson, the general commanding W Force, were poor: Wilson brought across a Colonel Quilliam from GHQ Middle East to act as his own intelligence chief and so to bypass Casson. Casson was at Wilson's headquarters as a major on 6 April 1941, when the German invasion of Greece began. He was on the Greek island of Crete during the German airborne invasion of May 1941, and once again came close to being captured.

Casson was back at Smedley's Hydro, as a lieutenant colonel and the school's assistant commandant, in June 1942. In 1943, Casson wrote Greece and Britain, a work which expounded upon the historical connections between the two countries in order to emphasise the importance of the wartime alliance between them. After the foundation of the Allied Monuments, Fine Arts, and Archives program (MFA&A, or "Monuments Men"), which began operations in August 1943, Casson was appointed to direct the MFA&A branch of the British forces in Greece. (Note: Harclerode & Pittaway 2000, p. 79. For the foundation of the MFA&A program, see Pollard 2020, p. 212 and Holder 2010, p. 122.) He was appointed on the recommendation of Leonard Woolley, by now the archaeological advisor to the British War Office.

Casson later became a member of the Special Operations Executive (SOE), and was appointed as SOE's liaison officer for Greece. He was killed on 17 April 1944 as a passenger on the Vickers Warwick aircraft BV247 of No. 525 Squadron RAF, which crashed into the sea near Newquay in Cornwall while bound for Brindisi. Two other SOE agents, Stephen Maitland and Ivan Watkins Bert, as well as the MI9 attaché George Lionel Dawson-Damer, were also killed in the crash. Casson was buried at Fairpark cemetery in Newquay: the details of his death were suppressed owing to the classified nature of his work. The Greek government organised a requiem mass in his memory at Saint Sophia Cathedral, London: Casson was the first British officer to receive this during the Second World War.

== Assessment and honours ==
Casson was elected a fellow of the Society of Antiquaries of London, made an honorary member of the Bulgarian Archaeological Institute, and awarded the Greek Order of the Redeemer. He was also elected an honorary associate of the Royal Institute of British Architects. His 1926 Macedonia, Thrace and Illyria was described by the Thracian archaeologist Nikola Theodossiev as the first major English scholarly work on Thrace; Myres described it as Casson's "most extensive contribution to learning". Theodossiev wrote in 2020 that it remained a "seminal work" in its field.

A 1933 review of Casson's Artists at Work described him as "one of the foremost authorities on Greek sculpture", and judged that "if more critics would acquaint themselves with art in the making, as Mr. Casson has done, we might hope for a sounder interpretation." In 2015, the archaeologist David Ridgway wrote that Casson had contributed "incisively" to many areas of Greek scholarship.

In 1936, Casson's Oxford colleague Isaiah Berlin described him in a letter to the poet Stephen Spender as "an absolutely unimportant, unlearned, persecuted little buffoon who calls himself a communist and raises laughs at New College." (Note: Letter to Stephen Spender, 20 June 1936: Berlin 2004, p. 173.) The historian Antony Beevor has judged him as "brilliant ... [but] rather out of touch" in intelligence work during the Second World War. The novelist Evelyn Waugh, who attended one of Casson's intelligence briefs during the period, called him a "beastly don".

Casson was a long-serving member of the Authors' Club: in February 1944, shortly before his death, he was invited to join the club's executive committee. After Casson's death, the club's committee commissioned his wife, Elizabeth, to compile a bibliography of his writings in his memory, and hosted a reception in his honour on 29 November 1945 alongside the Anglo-Hellenic League at the Dorchester hotel in London. At the reception, money was collected towards the foundation of a library of English-language books in Greece.

== Selected publications ==
=== As author ===
- Casson, Stanley (1912). "Some Trade Routes in the Aegean Area". The Antiquary. 48: 207–211, 257–262 – via Internet Archive.
- — (1916). "Note on the Ancient Sites in the Area Occupied by the British Salonika Force During the Campaign 1916–1918". Bulletin de Correspondance Hellénique. 40: 293–297. doi:10.3406/bch.1916.1479.
- — (1920). "An Eretrian Goldsmith and an Archaic Eretrian Sculpture". Journal International d'Archéologie Numismatique. 20: 89–96.
- — (1921a). Brooke and Skyros. Illustrated by Phyllis Gardner. London: E. Mathews. OCLC 697598897.
- — (1921b). Catalogue of the Acropolis Museum. Vol. 2: Sculpture and Architectural Fragments. Cambridge: Cambridge University Press. OCLC 941056409.
- — (1921c). "The Dorian Invasion Reviewed in the Light of Some New Evidence". The Antiquaries Journal. 1 (3): 199–221. doi:10.1017/S0003581500002249.
- — (1922). "The Sacred Mountain of Pangaeum". Discovery. 3: 257–261.
- — (1926a). Macedonia, Thrace and Illyria: Their Relations to Greece from the Earliest Times Down to the Time of Philip, Son of Amyntas. London: Oxford University Press. OCLC 3054972.
- — (1926b). "A New Copy of a Portrait of Demosthenes". The Journal of Hellenic Studies. 46 (1): 72–79. doi:10.2307/625572. JSTOR 625572.
- — (1926c). "Thracian Tribes in Scythia Minor". Journal of Roman Studies. 17: 97–101. doi:10.2307/296102. JSTOR 296102.
- — (1927). "The Growth of Legend". Folklore. 38 (3): 255–271. doi:10.1080/0015587X.1927.9718388. JSTOR 1256391.
- — (August 1928). "Silenus in the Rose Garden". The Atlantic.
- — (1928). Some Modern Sculptors. Oxford: Oxford University Press. OCLC 1159753.
- — (April 1929). "The New York of the Ancient World". The Listener. Vol. 1, no. 12.
- — (August 1929). "Bœotia in August". The Atlantic.
- — (November 1929). "Balkanomania". The Atlantic.
- — (1930). "Modern Architectural Sculpture". Journal of the Royal Society of Arts. 78 (4068): 1257–1258. JSTOR 41358622.
- — (1930). "Some Technical Methods of Archaic Sculpture". Journal of Hellenic Studies. 50 (2): 313–326. doi:10.2307/626820. JSTOR 626820.
- — (1930). Twentieth Century Sculptors. Oxford: Oxford University Press. OCLC 257028527.
- — (March 1931). "Antrosophy". The Atlantic.
- — (1931). "Byzantinism". The Burlington Magazine for Connoisseurs. 59 (344): 208–209, 211–213. JSTOR 864910.
- — (1931). "The Hermes of Praxiteles". American Journal of Archaeology. 35 (3): 262–268. doi:10.2307/498564. JSTOR 498564.
- — (July 1931). "The Lost War". The Atlantic.
- — (December 1931). "The Lost Millennium". The Atlantic.
- — (1932). "A Matter of Emphasis". Greece and Rome. 2 (4): 5–20. doi:10.1017/S0017383500001443. JSTOR 641514.
- — (April 1933). "Silver Magpies". The Atlantic.
- — (1934). Catalogue of the Marbles, Gems, Bronzes, and Coins of the Warren Collection of Greek and Roman Antiquities. Brunswick: Bowdoin College. OL 51509732M.
- — (1934). "The Mosaics of St. Sophia". The American Magazine of Art. 27 (12): 634–640. JSTOR 23933254.
- — (1934). Progress of Archaeology. London: G. Bell and Sons. OCLC 1326000.
- — (1934). "Technique of Greek Sculpture". American Journal of Archaeology. 38 (2): 280–284. doi:10.2307/498082. JSTOR 498082.
- — (1935). "A Byzantine Master". The Burlington Magazine for Connoisseurs. 66 (385): 184, 186–187. JSTOR 866031.
- — (1935). "Early Greek Inscriptions on Metal: Some Notes". American Journal of Archaeology. 39 (4): 510–517. doi:10.2307/498159. JSTOR 498159.
- — (1935). "Late Anglo-Saxon Sculpture". The American Magazine of Art. 28 (6): 326–336. JSTOR 23939373.
- — (1935). Steady Drummer: A Memoir of the Salonika Front. London: G. Bell and Sons. OCLC 5756432.
- — (July 1935). "Challenge to Complacency: What Future Archaeologists Will Think of Us". The Atlantic.
- — (August 1936). "The Palace of Minos". The Atlantic.
- — (September 1936). "Archeology from the Air". Scientific American. 155 (3): 130–132. Bibcode:1936SciAm.155..130C. doi:10.1038/scientificamerican0936-130. JSTOR 24997187.
- — (1937). Progress and Catastrophe: An Anatomy of Human Adventure. New York: Harper and Brothers. OCLC 3103235.
- — (1937). "An Unfinished Colossal Statue at Naxos". The Annual of the British School at Athens. 37: 21–25. doi:10.1017/S0068245400017937. JSTOR 30096657.
- — (1938a). "The Modern Pottery Trade in the Aegean". Antiquity. 12 (48): 464–473. doi:10.1017/S0003598X00014137.
- — (1938b). Murder by Burial. New York: Harper and Brothers. OCLC 10418248.
- — (1939). "The Cypriot Script of the Bronze Age". Iraq. 6 (1): 39–44. doi:10.2307/4241637. JSTOR 4241637.
- — (1939). The Discovery of Man: The Story of the Inquiry into Human Origins. New York: Harper and Brothers. OCLC 1453198.
- — (May 1939). "Light from the East". The Atlantic.
- — (1939). "Outstanding Needs in the Archaeology of the Eastern Mediterranean". Annual Report of the Institute of Archaeology: 1–16.
- — (1939). "Professor Gjersiad on Cyprus". Journal of Hellenic Studies. 59 (2): 287–288. doi:10.2307/626601. JSTOR 626601.
- — (1939). "Submarine Research in Greece". Antiquity. 13 (49): 80–86. doi:10.1017/S0003598X00014356.
- — (1941). Greece Against the Axis. London: H. Hamilton. OCLC 1251512 – via Google Books.
- — (1942). "How Homer Wrote the Odyssey". Antiquity. 16 (61): 71–84. doi:10.1017/S0003598X00016021.
- — (1943). Greece and Britain. London: Collins. OCLC 1891668.

=== As co-author ===
- Casson, Stanley; Talbot Rice, David; Hudson, Geoffrey Francis; Jones, Arnold Hugh Martin (1928). Preliminary Report upon the Excavations Carried Out in the Hippodrome of Constantinople in 1927 on Behalf of the British Academy. London: Humphrey Milford. OCLC 230314497.
- Casson, Stanley; Talbot Rice, David; Hudson, Geoffrey Francis; Jones, Arnold Hugh Martin; Gray, Basil (1929). Second Report upon the Excavations Carried Out in the Hippodrome of Constantinople in 1928. London: Humphrey Milford. OCLC 18606898.

=== As editor ===
- Casson, Stanley, ed. (1933). Artists at Work. London: G. G. Harrap and Company. OCLC 4678755.

== Works cited ==
- Agard, W. G. (1933). "Reviewed Work: Artists at Work by Stanley Casson". The American Magazine of Art. 26 (7): 353. JSTOR 23954723.
- Ashcroft, Michael (2022). In the Shadows: The Extraordinary Men and Women of the Intelligence Corps. Hull: Biteback Publishing. ISBN 9781785906695.
- Battistelli, Pier Paolo (2021). The Balkans 1940–41 (1): Mussolini's Fatal Blunder in the Greco-Italian War. New York: Bloomsbury USA. ISBN 978-1-4728-4257-2.
- Boardman, John (1985). "100 Year of Classical Archaeology at Oxford". In Kurtz, Donna (ed.). Beazley and Oxford: Lectures Deliveres in Wolfson College, Oxford, 28 June 1986. Oxford University Committee for Archaeology. pp. 43–56. ISBN 0-947816-10-0.
- Beevor, Antony (2011). Crete: The Battle and the Resistance. London: John Murray. ISBN 978-1-84854-635-6.
- Berlin, Isaiah (2004). Hardy, Henry (ed.). Letters: 1928–1946. Cambridge: Cambridge University Press. ISBN 0-521-83368-X.
- Cameron, George G. (1979). "Sir Max Mallowan 1904–1978". The Biblical Archaeologist. 42 (3): 180–183. doi:10.2307/3209389. JSTOR 3209389.
- Cooper, Artemis (2012). Paddy Leigh Fermor: An Adventure. London: John Murray. ISBN 978-1-84854-670-7.
- Crockett, Emily; Sorensen, Lee (27 June 2018). "Casson, Stanley". Dictionary of Art Historians.
- Draper, Frederick William Marsden (1962). Four Centuries of Merchant Taylors' School, 1561–1961. Oxford University Press. OCLC 1112578102.
- Fantauzzo, Justin (2020). The Other Wars: The Experience and Memory of the First World War in the Middle East and Macedonia. Cambridge University Press. ISBN 978-1-108-47900-4.
- Gill, David (2011). Sifting the Soil of Greece: The Early Years of the British School at Athens. Bulletin of the Institute of Classical Studies. Vol. 111. London: Institute of Classical Studies. ISBN 978-1-905670-32-1.
- Gill, David (2018). Winifred Lamb: Aegean Prehistorian and Museum Curator. Oxford: Archaeopress. ISBN 978-1-78491-880-4.
- Golvin, Jean-Claude (2002). "La spina de l'hippodrome de Constantinople" [The Spina of the Hippodrome of Constantinople]. Bulletin de la Société nationale des Antiquaires de France (in French). 2002: 129–151. doi:10.3406/bsnaf.2008.10591.
- Harclerode, Peter; Pittaway, Brendan (2000). The Lost Masters: World War II and the Looting of Europe's Treasurehouses. New York: Welcome Rain. ISBN 978-1-56649-165-5.
- Heawood, Edward (1923). "Geographical Literature: Additions to the Library". Supplement to the Geographical Journal. 1 (12): 465–505. JSTOR 23222917.
- Higham, Robert (2009) [1986]. Diary of a Disaster: British Aid to Greece, 1940–1941 (PDF). Lexington: The University Press of Kentucky. ISBN 978-0-8131-9291-8.
- Holder, Frederick Christopher (2010). "The Big Picture: Protection of Cultural Material". Traffic: An Interdisciplinary Graduate Journal. 12: 135–153.
- Hood, Rachel (1998). Faces of Archaeology in Greece: Caricatures by Piet de Jong. Oxford: Leopard's Head. ISBN 0-904920-38-0.
- Hopkins, Lisa (2021). Burial Plots in British Detective Fiction. Cham: Springer. ISBN 978-3-030-65760-4.
- Hunt, David (2014) [1966]. A Don at War (Revised ed.). London and New York: Routledge. ISBN 978-1-135-22386-1.
- Lewis, Jan (2021). Mediating the Past: BBC Radio Archaeology Broadcasting, 1922–1966 (PDF) (Ph.D). Bournemouth University.
- Llewellyn-Smith, Michael (2017). "Foreword: Archaeology Behind the Battle Lines" (PDF). In Shapland, Andrew; Stefani, Evangelia (eds.). Archaeology Behind the Battle Lines: The Macedonian Campaign (1915–19) and Its Legacy. Abingdon: Routledge. pp. xv–xviii. ISBN 978-1-351-97810-1.
- London, Lucy (2022). "A Brief Biography of Stanley Casson". Stanley Casson: Poems and Prose. By Casson, Stanley. London, Lucy; Breeze, Paul (eds.). Wallasey: The Nadja Malacrida Society. pp. 24–27. ISBN 978-1-909643-50-5.
- Mace, Martin (2012). Unearthing Churchill's Secret Army: The Official List of SOE Casualties and Their Stories. Barnsley: Pen & Sword Books. ISBN 978-1-78337-664-3.
- McClymont, W. G. (1959). To Greece. Official History of New Zealand in the Second World War 1939–45. Wellington: War History Branch, Department of Internal Affairs. OCLC 4373298.
- Morgan, Catherine (2017). "The British Salonika Force, the British School at Athens, and the Archaic–Hellenistic Archaeology of Macedonia". In Shapland, Andrew; Stefani, Evangelia (eds.). Archaeology Behind the Battle Lines: The Macedonian Campaign (1915–19) and Its Legacy. Abingdon: Routledge. pp. 121–180. ISBN 978-1-351-97810-1.
- Murley, James (2012). The Impact of Edward Perry Warren on the Study and Collections of Greek and Roman Antiquities in American Academia (Ph.D). University of Louisville. doi:10.18297/etd/1028.
- Myres, John L. (1944). "Lieut.-Colonel Stanley Casson". Nature. 153 (3890): 613. Bibcode:1944Natur.153..613M. doi:10.1038/153613a0.
- Myres, John L. (1945). "Stanley Casson 1889–1944". Annual of the British School at Athens. 41: 1–4. doi:10.1017/S0068245400004147. JSTOR 30096903.
- "The Nations and Britain". Western Mail. 19 November 1943. p. 2 – via British Newspaper Archive.
- "Obituary". The Ipswichian. 20 (11): 300–302. December 1944.
- Papadopoulos, Angelos (2012). "Introduction: Current Research and Perspectives on the Late Bronze Age Eastern Mediterranean" (PDF). Talanta: Proceedings of the Dutch Archaeological and Historical Society. 44: 13–18.
- Pollard, Nigel (2020). Bombing Pompeii: World Heritage and Military Necessity. Ann Arbor: University of Michigan Press. ISBN 978-0-472-13220-1.
- Poole, William (2016). "More Stanley Casson Materials" (PDF). New College Notes. 7: 1–3.
- Ridgway, David (2015). "Casson, Stanley (1899–1944)". In de Grummond, Nancy (ed.). An Encyclopaedia of the History of Classical Archaeology. Abingdon: Routledge. p. 253. ISBN 1-884964-80-X.
- Robertson, Martin; Beard, Mary (1991). "Adopting an Approach". In Rasmussen, Tom; Spivey, Nigel (eds.). Looking at Greek Vases. Cambridge University Press. pp. 1–36. ISBN 0-521-37524-X.
- Schüler, C. J. (9 March 2018). "A Lost Hero of the Authors' Club". C. J. Schüler: Writer and editor.
- Seefeldt, Connor (2012). Factum ex Scientia: I Canadian Corps Intelligence during the Liri Valley Campaign, May–June 1944 (M.A.). University of Ottawa.
- "Special Reserve of Officers". The London Gazette. 28918: 7691–7696. 29 September 1914.
- Stockings, Craig; Hancock, Eleanor (2013). Swastika over the Acropolis: Re-Interpreting the Nazi Invasion of Greece in World War II. History of Warfare. Vol. 92. Leiden: Brill. ISBN 978-90-04-25459-6.
- Theodossiev, Nikola (2020). "An Introduction to Studying Ancient Thrace". In Valeva, Julia; Nankov, Emil; Graninger, Denver (eds.). A Companion to Ancient Thrace. Hoboken: Wiley. pp. 3–11. ISBN 978-1-119-01618-2.
- Thornton, Amara (2018). Archaeologists in Print: Publishing for the People. London: UCL Press. doi:10.14324/111.9781787352575. ISBN 978-1-78735-259-9.
- Waugh, Evelyn (1980). Amory, Mark (ed.). The Letters of Evelyn Waugh. London: Orion. ISBN 978-0-297-77657-4.
- Woolley, Leonard (1947). A Record of the Work Done by the Military Authorities for the Protection of the Treasures of Art and History in War Areas. London: H.M. Stationery Office. OCLC 6511916.
