= Alice Gardner =

English historian (1854–1927)

Alice Gardner FRHistS
- Born: 26 April 1854; Hackney
- Died: 11 November 1927 (aged 73); Warneford Hospital
- Education: Newnham College
- Occupations: Historian and teacher

Alice Gardner, FRHistS (26 April 1854 – 11 November 1927) was an English historian. Her publications included a history of Newnham College, Cambridge.

== Life ==
Gardner was born in Hackney, London, in 1854. She was one of six children and two her brother Ernest Arthur Gardner and Percy Gardner were noted archaeologists. At first she was educated at home but she then went to a school at Laleham created by Hannah Pipe in 1869. She went on to Newnham College, Cambridge in 1876. She was mentored by Mandell Creighton. In 1879, she came top of the history tripos with Sarah Marshall. The male students were all behind them.

She wrote and published a number of important books. The first was Synesius of Cyrene: Philosopher and Bishop which was her debut published by the SPCK in 1885. Ten years later she published Julian: Emperor and Philosopher. Studies in John the Scot was published in 1900 and Theodore of Studium: his Life and Times in 1905 and The Lascarids of Nicaea: the Story of an Empire in Exile in 1912.

After she left university, she taught at Plymouth High School for Girls from 1880 to 1982, and was then briefly Professor of Ancient and Modern History at Bedford College, London. In 1884, she returned to her alma mater Newnham College, Cambridge, as a lecturer in history and director of studies. She first retired in 1914.

With the outbreak of the First World War, she briefly worked at the Foreign Office, before she taking over University of Bristol's history department in 1915 as their teaching staff had been drafted for war work. She wanted this university to aspire to Cambridge's older standards. In thanks she was awarded an honorary Master of Arts (MA) degree in 1918 and appointed Reader in Byzantine History at Bristol in 1920. Cambridge was not yet authorised to award a woman a degree, but Newnham's Principal, Anne Clough, supported her research in Asia Minor and Bulgaria. She was teaching in Bristol in 1921 when Newnham College celebrated its fiftieth birthday. Gardner published A Short History of Newnham College, Cambridge.

She was a Fellow of the Royal Historical Society (FRHistS). She served as an elected member of its council until she stepped down in 1925.

Gardner died in Warneford Hospital in Oxford in 1927.

== Works ==
- Synesius of Cyrene: Philosopher and Bishop, 1885,
- Julian: Emperor and Philosopher, 1895
- Studies in John the Scot, 1900
- Theodore of Studium: his Life and Times, 1905
- The Lascarids of Nicaea, 1912
- A Short History of Newnham College, Cambridge, 1921

== Sources ==
- Covert, James (2000), A Victorian Marriage: Mandell and Louise Creighton, London: Hambledon and London, ISBN 1-85285-260-7
