= Charles Abel Heurtley =

English theologian (1806–1895)

Charles Abel Heurtley (b Bishopwearmouth 4 January 1806; d Christ Church, Oxford 1 May 1895) was an English theologian.

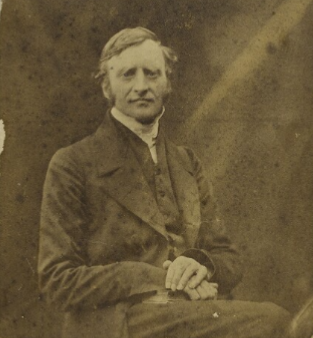
Charles Abel Heurtley circa 1856

Heurtley was educated at Louth Grammar School and Corpus Christi College, Oxford, of which college he was a Fellow from 1832 to 1841 when he became Rector of Fenny Compton. He was Lady Margaret Professor of Divinity at Oxford from 1853 until his death.

He married Jane Harrison, the daughter of Reverend William Bagshaw and Charlotte Harrison in 1844. They had one son and three daughters: Charles, Jane, Ellen and Frances.

Heurtley's son, also named Charles Abel Heurtley, followed him into the church and became vicar of Ashington, West Sussex. The younger Charles Heurtley's son, Walter Abel Heurtley, became a classical archaeologist.

His daughter Jane married Sydney Linton, Bishop of Riverina.

== Works (partial list) ==
- On Faith and the Creed: Dogmatic Teaching of the Church of the Fourth and Fifth Centuries (1886)

Academic offices
Preceded by Godfrey Faussett	Lady Margaret Professor of Divinity; 1853–1895	Succeeded by William Sanday
