= The Journal of Hellenic Studies =

- Discipline: Hellenic studies
- Language: English
- Edited by: Lin Foxhall

Publication details
- History: 1880–present
- Publisher: Cambridge University Press on behalf of the Society for the Promotion of Hellenic Studies (United Kingdom)
- Frequency: Annually
- Impact factor: 0.1 (2022)

Standard abbreviations
- ISO 4: J. Hell. Stud.

Indexing
- ISSN: 0075-4269 (print); 2041-4099 (web)
- LCCN: 09020515
- JSTOR: 00754269
- OCLC no.: 436724650

Links
- Journal homepage; Online access; Online archive

The Journal of Hellenic Studies is an annual peer-reviewed academic journal covering research in Hellenic studies. It also publishes reviews of recent books of importance to Hellenic studies. It was established in 1880 and is published by Cambridge University Press on behalf of the Society for the Promotion of Hellenic Studies. The editor-in-chief is Lin Foxhall (University of Liverpool). According to the Journal Citation Reports, the journal has a 2022 impact factor of 0.1.

== Editors ==
The following have been editors-in-chief of the journal:

- Percy Gardner, 1879–1895
- Ernest Arthur Gardner, 1897–1932
- Alan Sommerstein, 1989–1995
- Roger Brock, 2011–2016
- Douglas Cairns, 2016–2021
- Lin Foxhall, since 2021
