= Percy Gardner =

British archaeologist (1846–1937)

Percy Gardner FSA FBA
- Photographed by Walter Stoneman in 1917
- Born: 24 November 1846; London, England
- Died: 17 July 1937 (aged 90)
- Citizenship: United Kingdom

Academic background
- Education: City of London School
- Alma mater: Christ's College, Cambridge

Academic work
- Discipline: Archaeology
- Institutions: British Museum; Christ's College, Cambridge; University of Cambridge; Lincoln College, Oxford; University of Oxford

Percy Gardner (24 November 1846 – 17 July 1937) was an English classical archaeologist and numismatist. He was Disney Professor of Archaeology at the University of Cambridge from 1879 to 1887. He was Lincoln Professor of Classical Archaeology and Art at the University of Oxford from 1887 to 1925.

== Early life ==
Gardner was born in Hackney, Middlesex, United Kingdom on 24 November 1846 to Thomas Gardner and Ann Pearse. He was educated at the City of London School to the age of fifteen when he joined his father's stockbroker business. Having been unsuccessful in the field, in 1865 he matriculated into Christ's College, Cambridge. He graduated with a first-class Bachelor of Arts (BA) in the classics and moral sciences tripos in 1869. In 1870, he received the one year, University of Cambridge Whewell Scholarship in international law.

== Academic career ==
From 1871 to 1887, Gardner was an assistant in the Department of Coins and Medals at the British Museum. While there, he helped to write the first collections catalogues for Greek coins at the museum. He was elected a Fellow of Christ's College, Cambridge in 1872. He held the first editorship of The Journal of Hellenic Studies from 1879 to 1895. He was Disney Professor of Archaeology at the University of Cambridge from 1879 to 1886. He then moved to the University of Oxford and held the Lincoln and Merton Professorship of Classical Archaeology from 1887 to 1925. During his time at the university, he had a stimulating influence on the study of ancient, and particularly Greek, art. He was succeeded by John Beazley. In his later years, he also became prominent as an historical critic on Biblical subjects.

Gardner died on 17 July 1937 in Oxford, England.

== Awards ==
Gardner was elected a Fellow of the British Academy (FBA) in 1903. He was elected a Foreign Honorary Member of the Archaeological Institute of America.

== Personal life ==
Gardner was married to Agnes Reid until their marriage broke down in 1874. His sister Alice Gardner was a historian and her brother, Ernest Arthur Gardner, was also an archaeologist.

== Selected works ==
- Stephani on the Tombs at Mycenae. The Journal of Hellenic Studies, 1, 94–106 (1880)
- Statuette of Pallas from Cyprus. The Journal of Hellenic Studies, 2, 326-331 (1881)
- Types of Greek Coins (1883)
- The Coins of the Greek and Scythic Kings of Bactria and India in the British Museum (1886)
- A Numismatic Commentary on Pausanias (with Friedrich Imhoof-Blumer, 1887)
- New Chapters in Greek History: Historical Results of Recent Excavations in Greece and Asia Minor (1892)
- Manual of Greek Antiquities (1895)
- Sculptured Tombs of Hellas (1896)
- Exploratio Evangelica: A Brief Examination of the Basis and Origin of Christian Belief (1899)
- A Historic View of the New Testament (1901)
- Oxford at the Crossroads: A Criticism of the Course of Litterae Humaniores in the University (1903)
- A Grammar of Greek Art (1905)
- Growth of Christianity: London Lectures (1907)
- The Religious Experience of Saint Paul (1911)
- The Ephesian Gospel (1915)
- Evolution in Christian Ethics (1918)
- A History of Ancient Coinage 700-300 B.C. Oxford: Clarendon Press. 1918.

Academic offices
Preceded by Churchill Babington	Disney Professor of Archaeology; 1879–1887	Succeeded by George Forrest Browne
Non-profit organization positions
Preceded by Sir Thomas Dyke Acland	President of the Churchmen's Union; 1915–1922	Succeeded by Hastings Rashdall
